= Prehistory of Mesopotamia =

History of lands by the Tigris and Euphrates

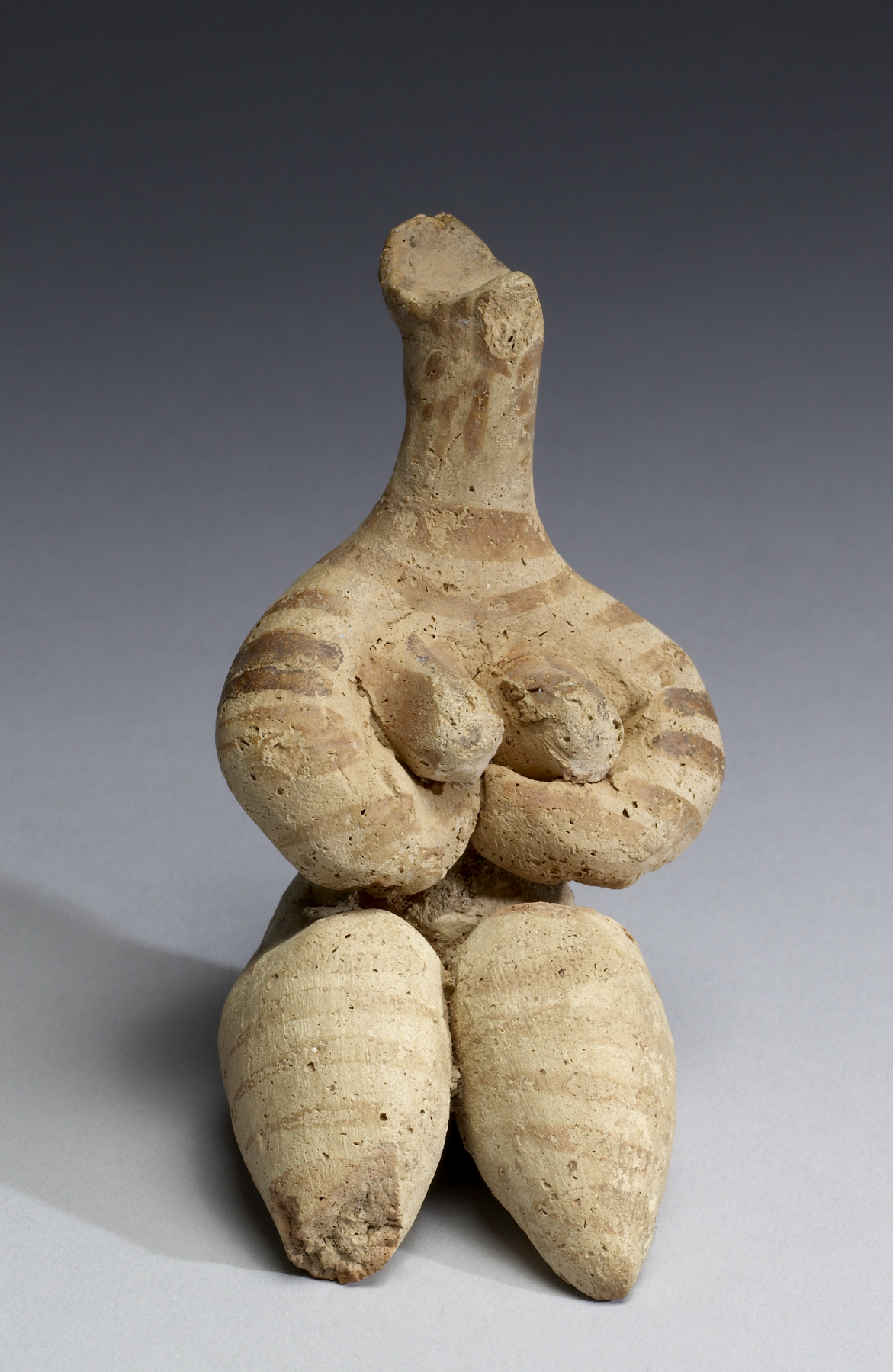
Seated parturient figurine from the Halaf period. Anatolia - 5th millennium BC. Walters Art Museum - Baltimore.

The prehistory of Mesopotamia is the period between the Paleolithic and the emergence of writing in the area of the Fertile Crescent around the Tigris and Euphrates rivers, as well as surrounding areas such as the Zagros foothills, southeastern Anatolia, and northwestern Syria.

In general, Paleolithic Mesopotamia is poorly documented, with the situation worsening in southern Mesopotamia for periods prior to the 4th millennium BC. Geological conditions meant that most of the remains were buried under a thick layer of alluvium or submerged beneath the waters of the Persian Gulf. The Middle Paleolithic witnessed the emergence of a population of hunter-gatherers who lived in the caves of the Zagros and, seasonally, in numerous open-air sites. They were producers of a lithic industry of the Mousterian type, and their funerary remains, found in the cave of Shanidar, indicate the existence of solidarity and the practice of healing between the members of a group. During the Upper Paleolithic, the Zagros was probably occupied by modern man. The Shanidar cave contains only tools made of bone or antler, typical of a local Aurignacian called "Baradostian" by specialists.

The late Epipaleolithic period, characterized by the Zarzian (c. 17,000–12,000 years BC), saw the appearance of the first temporary villages with circular permanent structures. The appearance of fixed objects such as sandstone or granite millstones and cylindrical basalt pestles indicated the beginning of sedentarization.

Between the 11th and 10th millennia BC, the first villages of sedentary hunter-gatherers are known in northern Iraq. Houses seem to have been built around a "hearth", a kind of family "property". The preservation of the skulls of the dead and artistic activity related to birds of prey have also been found. Around 10,000 to 7,000 BC, villages expanded in the Zagros and Upper Mesopotamia. The economy was mixed (hunting and the beginnings of agriculture). Houses became rectangular and the use of obsidian was recorded, which testifies to contacts with Anatolia where there were numerous deposits.

The 7th and 6th millennia BC saw the development of the so-called "ceramic" cultures known as "Hassuna", "Samarra", and "Halaf". They were characterized by the definitive introduction of agriculture and animal husbandry. Houses became more complex, with large communal dwellings built around a collective granary. The introduction of irrigation was another feature. While the Samarra culture shows signs of social inequality, the Halaf culture appears to be composed of small, disparate communities with little or no apparent hierarchy.

At the same time, the Ubaid culture developed in southern Mesopotamia at the end of the 7th millennium BC. Tell el-'Oueili is the oldest known site of this culture. Their architecture was elaborate and they practiced irrigation, essential in a region where agriculture was impossible without artificial water. In its greatest expansion, the Ubaid culture spread peacefully, probably by acculturating the Halaf culture, across northern Mesopotamia to southeastern Anatolia and northeastern Syria.

Villages, apparently not very hierarchical, expanded into cities, society became more complex, and an increasingly dominant fixed elite emerged toward the end of the 4th millennium BC. The most influential centers of Mesopotamia (Uruk and Tepe Gawra) saw the gradual emergence of writing and the state. Traditionally, this marks the end of prehistory.

== Geographical and archaeological setting ==
Main geographical areas of Near Eastern prehistory

Mesopotamia is located in the historical region of the Fertile Crescent in the ancient Near East, around the Tigris and Euphrates Rivers. Mesopotamia corresponds for the most part to present-day Iraq, with the addition of a northern fringe of present-day Syria and the southeastern part of Turkey. Two regions are distinguished within this area: Upper Mesopotamia, or Jezirah, and Lower Mesopotamia. Furthermore, the strong cultural similarities observed throughout Mesopotamian prehistory between the regions immediately east of the Tigris and west of the Euphrates allow for the study of a larger Mesopotamia bordering the foothills of the Zagros Mountains.

Upper Mesopotamia is a hilly, flat, steppe vegetation region with an average elevation of 200–300 meters, extending east of the Tigris and west of the Euphrates. Most of the region receives sufficient rainfall for dry farming. However, its southern limits are Ramadi on the Euphrates and Samarra on the Tigris. Practically undocumented for the Paleolithic and Epipaleolithic periods is the part of the Jezirah between the tributaries of the Tigris and Euphrates. This can be explained both from an archaeological point of view, given the scarcity of surveys in this area, and from a human point of view, as the region may have been virtually uninhabited during the periods in question.

Today, Lower Mesopotamia consists of a gently sloping alluvial plain (37 meters above sea level in Baghdad). Around 14,000 BC, the ancient delta of the Tigris and Euphrates rivers was at the level of the Gulf of Oman. Around 10,000 BC, only a third of the present surface of the Persian Gulf was covered by the sea. As a result, many Paleolithic sites are found beneath the waters of the Gulf. Thus, the flora, fauna, and prehistory of the once-dry delta remain unknown. The Tigris and Euphrates rivers, which carry and deposit alluvial deposits at the end of their courses, caused the sea level to rise again after the waters of the Gulf had risen. This last phenomenon buried under several meters of alluvium or a water table all the remains of sites that might have been established before the 4th millennium BC on a plain covered by steppes. The plains between the left bank of the Tigris and the foothills of the Zagros are the only remaining evidence of the steppe of southern Mesopotamia, once an extension of the southern Jezirah steppe. The present-day alluvial plains are therefore virtually devoid of any surface Paleolithic or Neolithic remains dating from before the 7th millennium BC. This is not because the sites were unoccupied, but rather because they have disappeared under several meters of alluvium, where they remain unexplored if not destroyed by natural forces.

== Lower Palaeolithic ==
While 600,000 years ago the Archantropians left flint tools all over the Mediterranean (Egypt, Syria, Palestine, Iran), departing from Turkey and the valleys of the Tigris and Euphrates, the first human traces in Mesopotamia appear to be rolled and bifacially carved pebbles discovered in 1984 near Mosul in Iraq, dating from the Late Acheulean, i.e. from the last quarter of the Lower Paleolithic (between 500,000 and 110,000 years BC).

== Middle Paleolithic ==
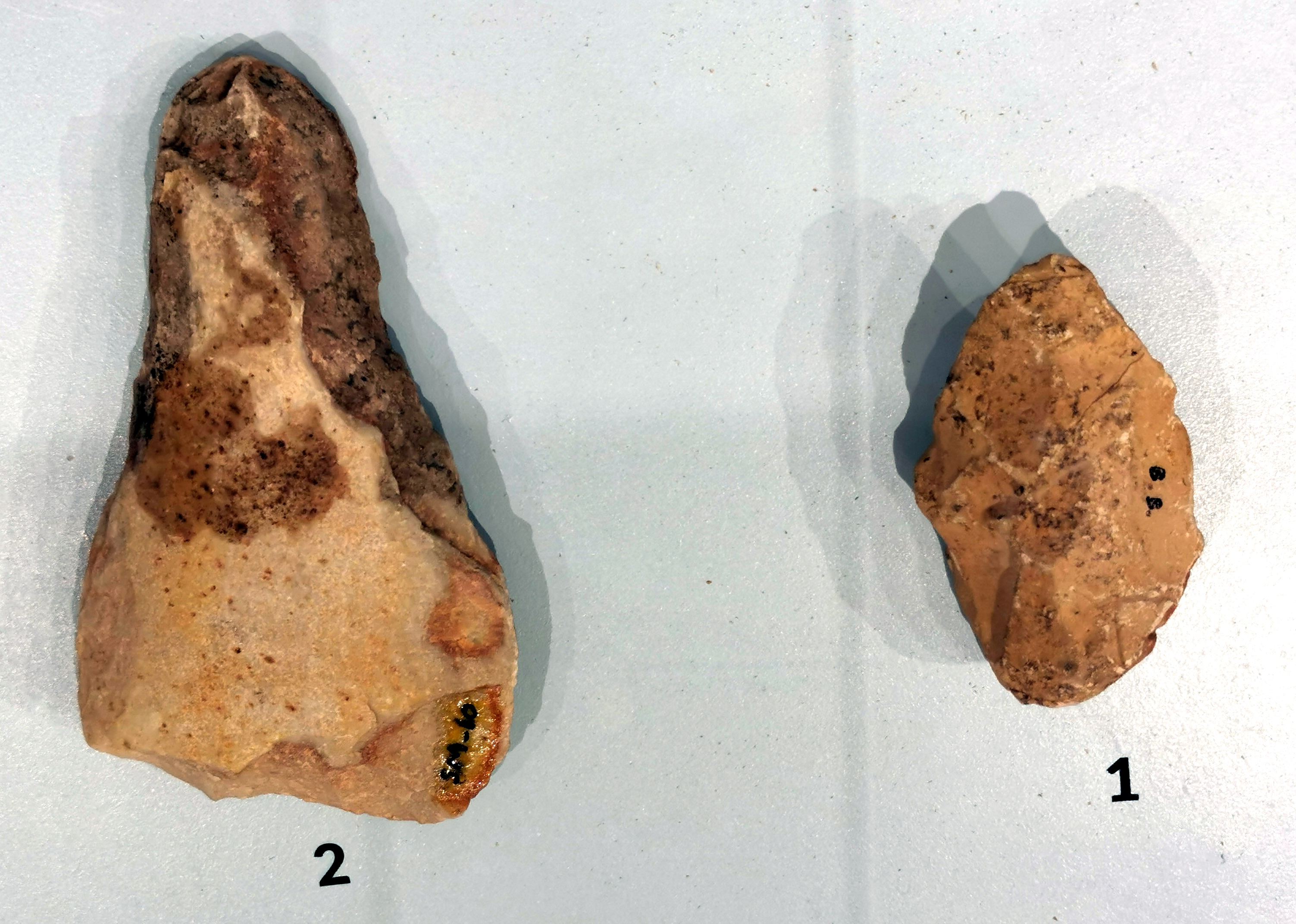
Bifaces from the Barda Balka site. Sulaymaniyah Museum.

Additional evidence of human presence was discovered in 1949 at Barda Balka ("Raised Stone" in Kurdish), not far from the town of Chamchamal in Iraqi Kurdistan. A number of carved flint artifacts found on the surface around a Neolithic megalith prompted a deeper investigation in 1950. Beneath fluvial sediments at a depth of 2 meters, hunter-gatherers discovered a kind of workshop or camp that had been occupied repeatedly over a short period of time. Their tools consisted of biface flint, axes, scrapers, and pebbles in the form of cleavers, suggesting stone working and butchery. These activities were carried out near a spring on the banks of a stream. On the basis of typological and geological criteria, it is estimated that the site dates back to 80,000 BP (years before present). This date seems to be confirmed by the discovery of animal bones, such as Asian elephant and rhinoceros, around the tools. Some time later, these animals disappeared from these regions.

At the beginning of the Würm Ice Age, prehistorians believed that people lived in caves on a seasonal basis. In 1928, British archaeologist Dorothy Garrod discovered a Mousterian lithic industry in the lower layers of the Hazar Merd cave in Iraqi Kurdistan, which is also found in many open-air sites.

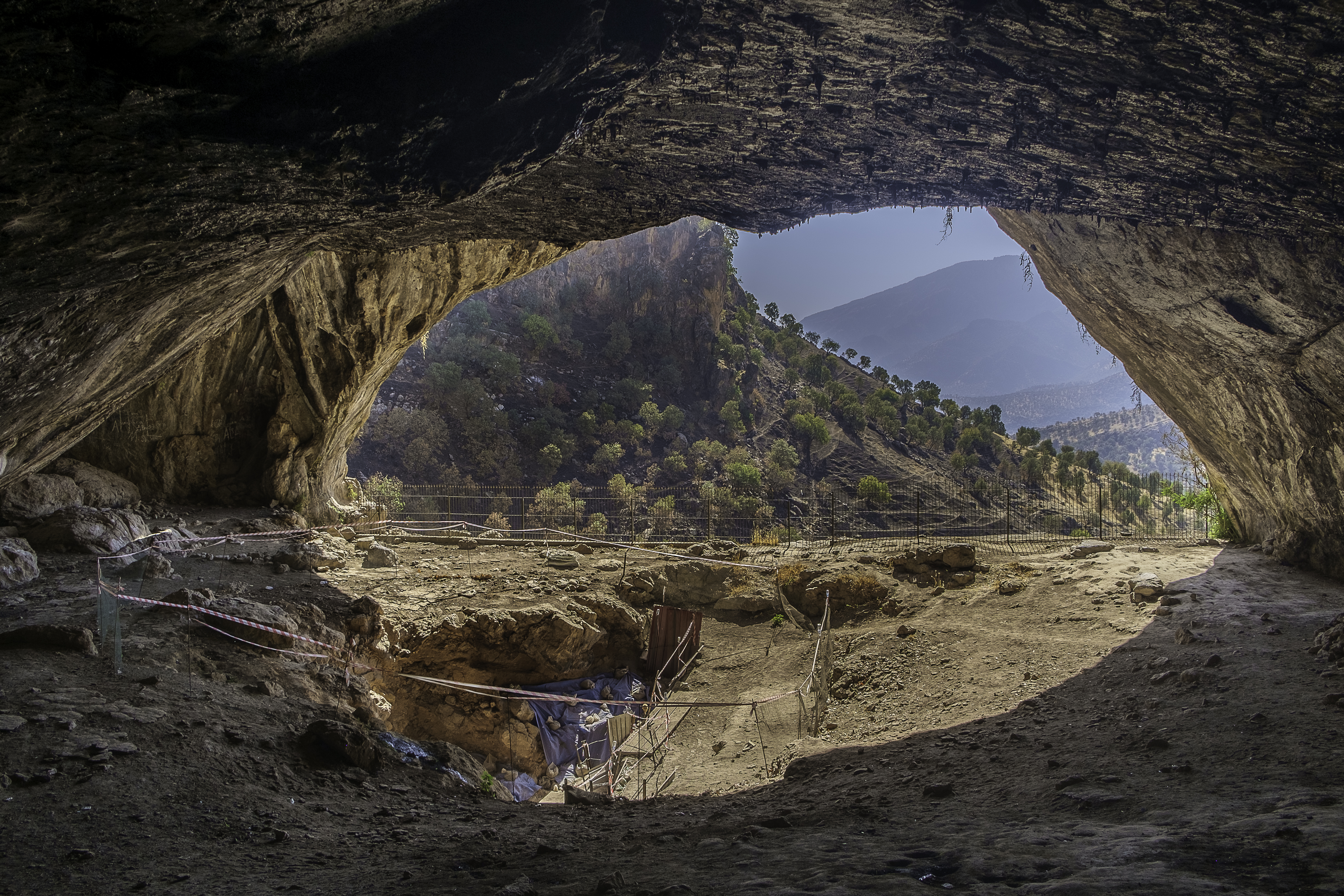
Inside Shanidar cave, with the archaeological site in the foreground

Meanwhile, in Iraqi Kurdistan, the Shanidar cave on the southern flank of Jebel Baradost in the foothills of the northern Zagros, in the province of Erbil in north-eastern Iraq, represents the most important archaeological site in the discovery of Middle and Upper Palaeolithic Mesopotamia. Between 1951 and 1960, the team led by American archaeologist Ralph Stefan Solecki excavated the floor of the cave and reached virgin rock at a depth of 14 meters. They discovered four different cultural levels. The deepest and thickest of these (8.5 meters), level D, attributed to the Middle Paleolithic, reveals layers of ash mixed with flint tools and bones, suggesting that the cave has been occupied intermittently since 60,000 BP, for about ten thousand years. Numerous tools such as points, scrapers, chisels, and drills characteristic of the Mousterian lithic industry were also found. Arrowheads found in the upper layers of level D, of the "Emirati" type and similar to those found in Palestine, suggest contacts with the Mediterranean Levant. In addition, the pollens found and analyzed in the laboratory allowed researchers to deduce strong climatic changes during the period of the cave's occupation: first warmer than today, then very cold, and finally hot and dry up to 44,000 years BP.

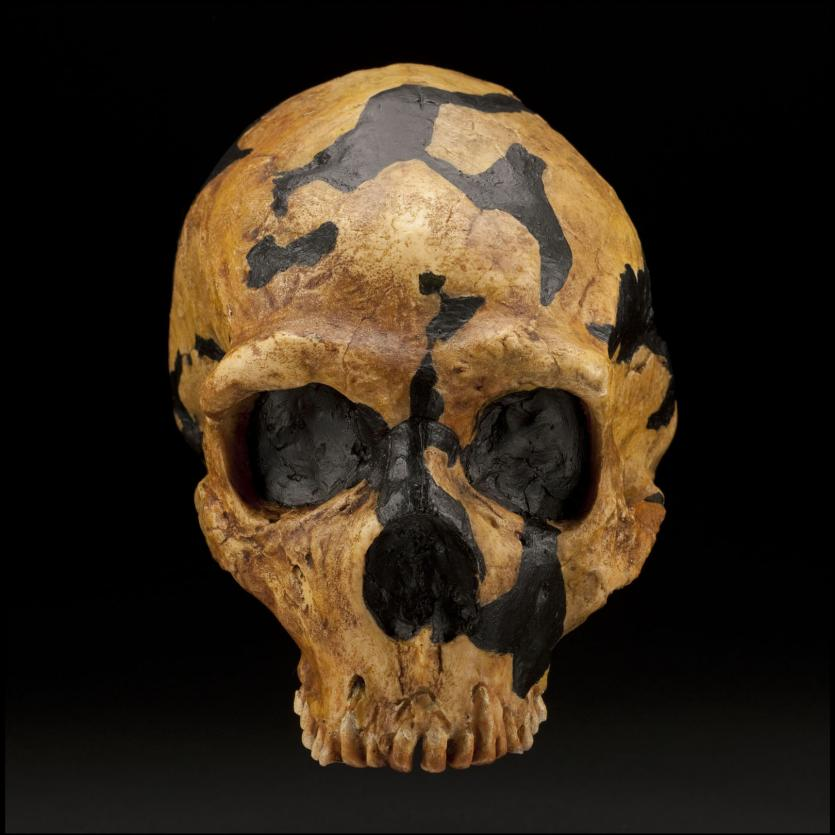
Skull of one of the Neanderthals discovered at Shanidar, named "Shanidar I"

But the greatest discovery was the presence of ten human skeletons, including two infants. These skeletons, most of them badly damaged, have been there since 60,000 BP for the oldest and 45,000 BP for the most recent. The skulls are in relatively good condition, with Neanderthal characteristics. These skeletons fall into two categories, which are separated by 10,000 years: the majority belong to men, women, and children who lived in the cave and died as a result of rocks falling from the ceiling; the other are bodies that were apparently placed there for burial between 50,000 and 45,000 years BC. One of the deposited dead appears to have been lying in a fetal position and covered with flowers; another, discovered in 2017 not far from the first, is resting.

These discoveries, in addition to observing possible burial practices, provide a better understanding of some Neanderthal behaviors. One of the skeletons shows so many traces of severe disabilities (including deafness and probably blindness) and severe injuries that its dependence on others seems obvious until its death at about forty. This suggests solidarity and care among members of a group. Conversely, the existence of interpersonal violence within the same group is suggested by another skeleton that shows evidence of rib injuries.

Regarding the lower regions, briefly excavated sites indicate that the desert south of the Euphrates and the regions adjacent to that river, or at least an earlier (fossil) system whose course was then quite different from today's, were traversed by bands during this period. Nevertheless, if there are campsites of this period in the plain, they are probably buried under river sediments.

== Upper Palaeolithic ==
Level C of the Shanidar Cave (between 34,000 and 26,500 BP) does not contain any skeletons indicating occupation during the Upper Paleolithic (between 45,000 and 12,000 BP). Only bone or antler objects have been found. Nonetheless, their Aurignacian-like style was so original that in 1963 the American archaeologist Ralph Stefan Solecki called them Baradostian (a reference to the Baradost Mountains, where the cave is located). During the Würm glacial maximum, which reached its coldest point around 20,000 BC, Shanidar Cave seems to have been deserted for about 10,000 years, perhaps because the cold forced the inhabitants down into the surrounding valleys, or because of the threat of falling rocks from the ceiling of the cave.

Mousterian stone tools, already present in the upper layers of Shanidar level D, seem to have become more refined: light and often pointed armatures indicate a renewed use of mechanically propelled weapons, such as the bow. This was an important feature of the lithic industry in the Upper Paleolithic of the Zagros. Moreover, despite the paucity of test pits, the pendants were numerous and mostly made from the atrophied canines of red deer, drilled into the flat of the root, or from perforated red marine shells, or fashioned from hematite. One of these imitates the silhouette of a deer's canine tooth, polished, shiny, and embellished with a series of peripheral notches. These aesthetic activities tend to reinforce the idea that a spiritual "revolution" accompanied the development of cutting techniques.

Other sites from this period have been discovered and excavated, stretching across the width of the Zagros to the foothill of the Himalayas. The Yafteh Cave in Lorestan is one of the most important. All these sites feature Aurignacian tools for the corresponding and higher time strata. Thus, in 2006, the term "Baradostian" was revised to define an earlier stage of the Aurignacian, intermediate between the Mousterian and an Aurignacian specific to the Zagros. In the eyes of the researcher Marcel Otte, all the Aurignacian material from the Zagros seems to assume a continuity, both technical and aesthetic, from east to west, to such an extent that a migratory tendency of the Zagros Aurignacian from Central Asia to southeastern Europe is confirmed, with the caves of the eastern foothills of the Zagros as an intermediary.

Moreover, even if we can assume that the Baradostian population consisted of people whose anatomy is or resembles that of modern humans, there are very few paleoanthropological documents to support this: one molar from the Eshkaft-e Gavi cave (southern Zagros) and one premolar from the Wezmeh cave. What's more, the chronology of these two witnesses has not been precisely determined.

== Epipaleolithic ==
At the beginning of the Epipaleolithic period (around 17,000–12,000 BP), during the last Ice Age, the northern regions of the Zagros, at medium and high altitudes, were deserted. The return of human presence was not felt until the climatic warming followed the last glacial maximum, in parallel with the Epipaleolithic facies known in the Levant and on the southern coast of Anatolia.

=== Zarzian ===
The end of the Epipaleolithic was marked by the Zarzian culture, which covered Iraqi Kurdistan with the Zarzi, Palegawra, and Shanidar B1 caves (reoccupied) then B2 (again uninhabited, but containing several burials), as well as the Zawi Chemi site. The latter is a "village" located 4 kilometers downstream from Shadinar Cave on the Great Zab River, and has been dated to the cave's B2 level (10,870 BP). The Zarzi cave, eponymous with the Zarzian culture, was discovered and excavated in the 1920s and 1930s by archaeologist Dorothy Garrod. Her discoveries were instrumental in defining the characteristics of the Zarzi culture, alongside those of the Natufian and Kebarian cultures of the Levant, also discovered in the 1930s. At the time, while archaeologists all but abandoned the Zagros, the Levant and the Natoufian culture were the focus of more detailed excavations. Despite this, more Zarzian sites were discovered in the 1960s - notably Warwasi, Pa Sangar, Ghar-i Khar - as well as a set of thirty-five bodies deposited in the Shadinar cave around 10,700 BP, which provided a better description of the Zarzian culture. Further research since the 1980s has shed light on elements such as climate, vegetation, and human activity. In 2006 and 2017, carbon-14 dating of animal bones found at several sites, such as Palegawra, allowed the refinement of various dates.

Carbon-14 dating at Shanidar and Palegawra indicates that the Zarzian presence began around 12,000 BP (Note: The dates of 19,300 to 13,000 BP are put forward following another carbon-14 dating carried out in 2017 at Palegawra Cave, but they need to be confirmed by further measurements at similar sites.) and probably ended with the advent of the Neolithic around 10,000 years ago. During this period, climatic conditions improved sufficiently to allow vegetation to spread to higher altitudes. The Western Zagros, populated by deer and goats, seems to have been covered by a dense wooded steppe, while the Palegawra documentation indicates the presence of oaks, poplars and even junipers or tamarisk. The banks of the Middle Euphrates and probably the Tigris are bordered by riparian forests of poplars, willows, and tamarisk. However, there is a certain discrepancy between pollen data and paleozoological data, especially in the Zagros region, where forest animal species sometimes appear where pollen diagrams indicate the existence of steppes.

==== Object manufacturing ====
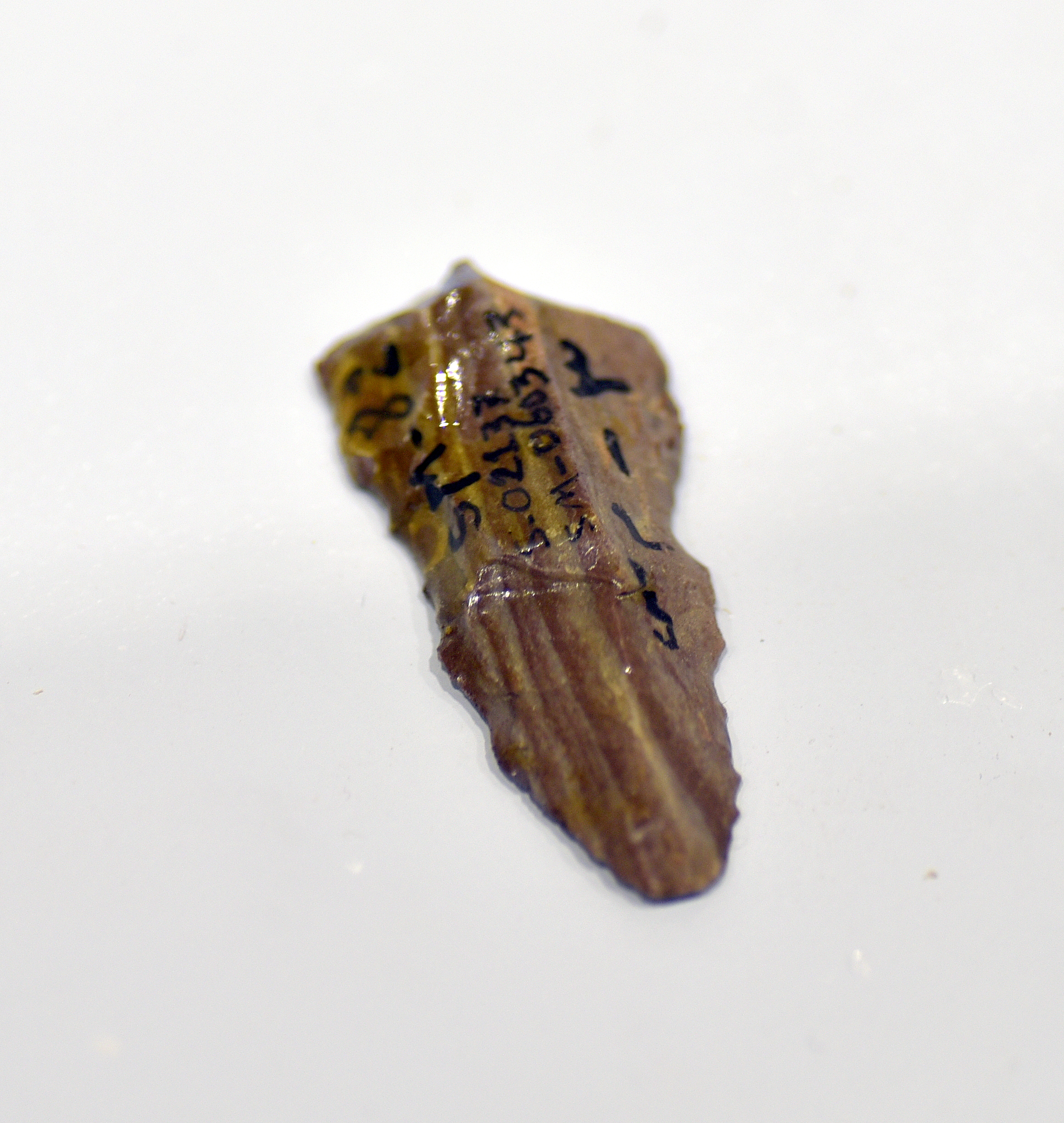
Flint from the Zarzi cave, c. 18,000–14,000 BP. Sulaymaniyah Museum

The reduction in tool size that began at the beginning of the Baradztian reached its peak during the Zarzian, with a variety of microlithic tools, notably in geometric shapes, including many triangles, trapezoids, and curved pieces at the end of the Zarzian. Polished axes have also been found at Palegawra and Zawi Chemi, but do not seem to belong to the Zarzian culture. The only polished axe that seems to belong to this culture comes from Deir Hajla in the Jezirah. As for heavy tools, various Late Zarzian sites, including Zawi Chemi, yield sandstone or granite millstones with cylindrical basalt pestles. Although some of these heavy tools can be transported - such as the 30-centimeter sandstone slabs found at Zawi Chemi - some appear to be embedded in the ground. Personal ornaments made from bones are also known. Some are made from marine shells, indicating the existence of a long-distance trade or travel network. Beads and pendants have also been found at Palegawra and Pa Sangar.

==== Habitat ====
The main characteristic of the Zagros inhabitants during the first part of the Zarzian period was movement. They traveled in bands from one place of subsistence to another. Places of occupation include small sites, such as hunting lodges without permanent structures, where small bands hunted, prepared, and brought the prey back to fixed base camps. Other sites appear to have been less frequently occupied transitional camps where stone tools were made or repaired. Base camps, on the other hand, were established under rock shelters or in larger caves such as Shanidar, Palegawra, or Pa Shangar. What these shelters seem to have in common is that they were located at the crossroads of different environments and offered a wide vantage point over the entire plain from which to observe the movements of prey (gazelles and onagers).

==== Alimentation ====
At sites such as Pa Sangar, Palegawra, Zarzi, and Shanidar, archaeologists note that hunting practices remained unchanged from earlier periods: goats and onagers were still the main sources of meat. However, the range of species hunted expanded considerably from earlier periods, with an increase in small prey such as partridge, duck, freshwater crab, clams, turtles, and, for the first time, fish. The Zarzi and Shanidar assemblages also contain shells of land snails. This diversity seems to be due to nutritional stress, forcing hunter-gatherers to collect smaller animals as larger animals became less available due to environmental changes. The Palegawra site also indicates the appearance of domestic dogs.

== The Late Zarzian or Proto-Neolithic period ==
=== Zawi Chemi ===
During the Late Zarzian, the Zawi Chemi site seems to indicate a trend towards sedentarization. Located in an open valley not far from the Great Zab River, a few kilometers from the Shanidar Cave, the site consists of separate dwellings of approximately circular or semicircular shape, wholly or partially dug into the ground. With a stone foundation, they sometimes have a light stone or wooden superstructure topped by an organic roof. In Zawi Chemi, there is also an enigmatic circular structure 2–3 meters high, near which there is a deposit of fifteen wild goat skulls and seventeen wings of birds of prey. This installation leads to the hypothesis of the ritual use of raptor wings or feathers to adorn clothing or headdresses, and reminds researcher Joan Oates of the avian frescoes at Çatalhöyük. However, although the site shows a clear trend towards sedentarization, it seems to have been occupied only during the spring and summer periods, as the winter residence is still unknown.

==== The Shanidar tombs ====
Shanidar B2 - the latest level (c. 10,750–10,000 BP) - is contemporary with the Zawi Chemi settlement. It shows no signs of human occupation, but is characterized by a semicircular stone construction and, above all, by numerous burials, many of which have been identified as those of children or adolescents. All the burials in the cave have probably not yet been excavated, as the excavation area only covers an area of 6 x 6 meters at the bottom of the cave. Therefore, there may be other unexplored tombs. Twenty-six graves containing the remains of at least 35 people have been identified. The bodies are unnaturally folded and sometimes stacked in both individual and collective graves. Some of the graves are surrounded by stones, and the bodies show no signs of specific mortuary practices. However, 15 graves have been provided with grave goods. These offerings mostly consist of beaded decorations, often made of colored stones, and sometimes shells or crab claws. The most richly decorated tombs are the children's tombs: one of them contains over 1,500 stone beads.

The motives for choosing the Shanidar Cave as a burial ground are still unknown. Perhaps the cave was recognized by the inhabitants of the Shadinar Valley as a place once inhabited by distant ancestors, or perhaps it was considered an effective shelter against animals or bad weather. Either way, the cemetery was not used for very long, and the bodies piled there - some skeletons damaged by the placement of new bodies - are very contemporary. While the Zarzian society seems to be organized in small groups of about twenty individuals under a more or less informal authority, but with an egalitarian structure, the discovery of gifts deposited near certain Shanidar bodies to the detriment of others suggests the emergence of an unequal social organization between individuals at the end of the Zarzien.

== First Mesopotamian villages ==
Main Neolithic ceramic sites in Mesopotamia and the Zagros

The seasonal villages of Zawi Chemi and Shanidar B1 seem to have given way to the first known sedentary villages in Northern Iraq: M'lefaat, Qermez Dere and Nemrik. These are located at the junction of the Zagros foothills and the Upper Mesopotamian steppe. Most of them were established between the 12th and 10th millennia BC. In many ways, they are considered the heirs of the Zarzians. However, their development is not felt until the 9th millennium BC, at the expense of the other cultures associated with the PPNA and PPNB, whose influence they only begin to feel from the 8th millennium BC onwards.

Still, population density was probably very low in northern Mesopotamia, and no sites have been recorded in the Jezirah Plain. This does not mean that there was no human presence: nomadic or more mobile communities may still have used part of the region on a seasonal basis. From an archaeological point of view, this is difficult to prove.

=== Hunting and gathering ===
Inhabitants of these villages still hunt and gather, and there is no trace of agriculture or animal husbandry during this sequence. Gazelles, hares, foxes, a few oxen, equines, and ovicaprinae are the hunters' preferred game, while gatherers harvest wheat, barley, lentils, peas, and vetches, all part of the local wild environment. These plants show no trace of domestication and no evidence of a predominance of cereals.

Nemrik, being closer to the mountains, which are less well supplied with plant foods than the plains, seems to have an economic base more closely linked to hunting. Numerous bolases, accompanied by the remains of hunted animals, which may simply have been shot by their hunters, suggest that young animals were captured for breeding purposes in the 7th millennium BC and that falconry was also possible, as it was much earlier in Zawi Chemi.

=== Family residences ===
The inhabitants of the villages of M'lefaat, Qermez Dere, and Nemrik had been sedentary hunter-gatherers since the 11th millennium BC, and in terms of housing they had perfected the skills of their Natoufian predecessors from the Levant: at Nemrik, houses buried in a circular pit included, in addition to wooden posts, two to four thick internal pillars. These vertically erect stone pillars, sometimes fashioned after an anthropomorphic model, support a terraced earth roof, some with ladders for roof access. These pillars are wrapped in a layer of clay and lime. Lime seems to have been used here earlier than in the Levant. In Nemrik and Qermez Dere, the floors are also repeatedly covered with lime. This continuous renovation and cleaning of individual houses suggests a significant social change: the transformation of the shelter into a notion of "home", a place of permanent residence for which a kind of family "property" could develop.

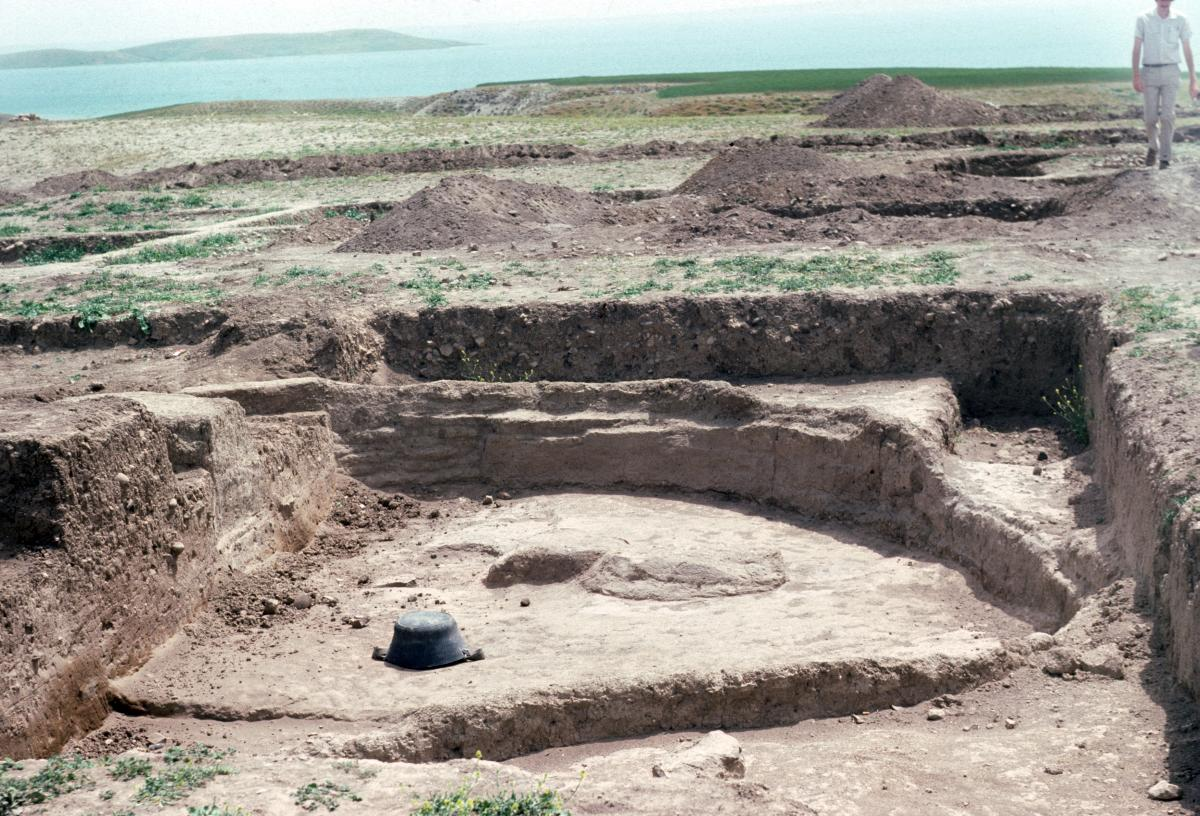
Houses buried in a round pit in Qermez Dere, north of Iraq.

Initially, houses were simply dug into the ground and were four to six meters wide. By the 9th millennium BC, they had expanded to a radius of between six and eight metres. In addition, at M'lefaat and Qermez Dere, villages were equipped with an open central area paved with pebbles. Designed for common household tasks, researchers have discovered millstones and fireplaces. Later, around the houses, the first low, above-ground walls of stone and/or earth were built around the original pit, and towards the end of the millennium, the first bricks appeared in Nemrik and M'lefaat. They replaced the stacked, dried earth of the low walls. They are made from a mixture of clay, water and a vegetable degreaser such as grain husk or chopped straw. The bricks are shaped in various ways (into wafers or cigars) and sun-dried - this is considered a characteristic of early Neolithic sites in northern and central Mesopotamia. They are cemented with a clay mortar. This prefabricated element technique avoids the drying time previously required between each layer of stacked earth.

=== Lithic materials ===
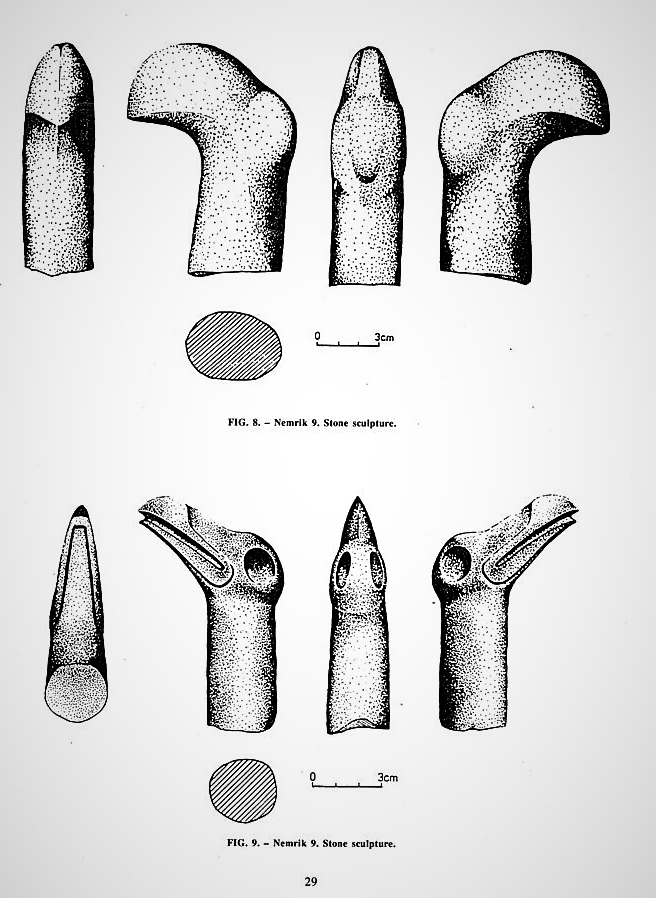
Nemrik polished stone representations of diurnal birds of prey

Even before the Natoufian of the Levant, the lithic industry, which was very homogeneous in the region and based on local raw materials, was characterized by the laminar cutting of flint by pressure and by stone polishing. However, changes in this industry seem to have been more discreet during the first two millennia of its existence. At Nemrik, excavators found heavy objects such as millstones, grinders, mortars and pestles, grinding and polishing stones. Lighter objects include stone balls (bolases), plates, mace heads, pointed objects, and polished axes (including miniature specimens). Rarer stone vessels have also been discovered, one of which is made of marble.

Around 9500 BC, M'lefaat, although far removed from the Khiamian context, seems to be under Syrian influence, since El Khiam points are used. However, in the last phase of this industry - which Jacques Cauvin calls "Nemrikian" - more original diamond-shaped arrowheads appear: the "Nemrik points". From this period, archaeologists at M'leffat have found bone punches, beveled edges, and the oldest known collection of tokens.

=== Art and rituals ===
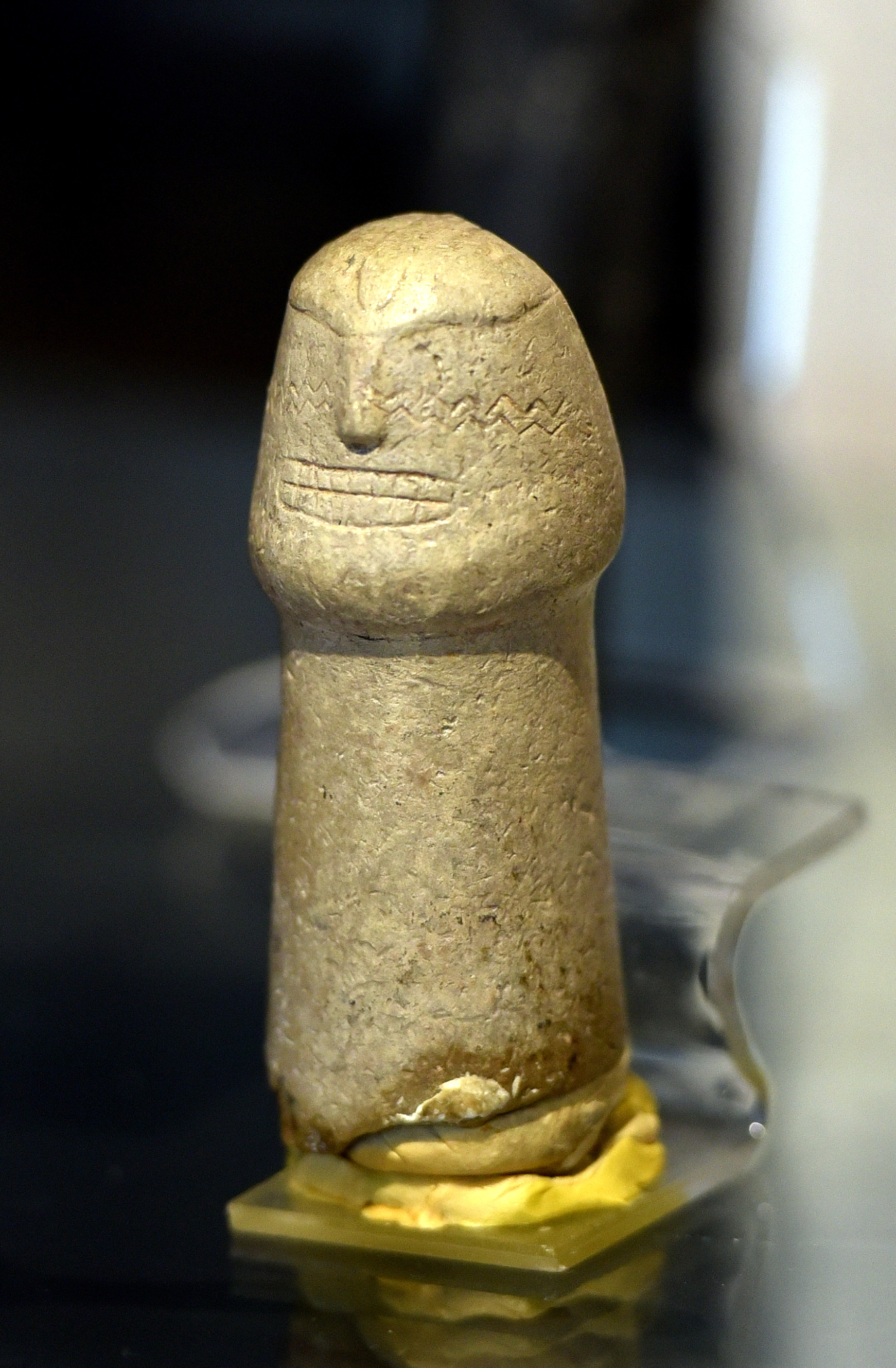
Primitive stone representation of a human figure. Nemrik - Iraq (8000–5000 BC). National Museum of Iraq - Baghdad.

Symbolic representations of birds of prey are found in polished stone, especially at Nemrik, carved at the end of stone rods (probably pestles). These birds of prey are related to the Zawi Chemi bone deposit discovered in 1960 and studied by Rose Solecki. They bear witness to an original local cult and could support the hypothesis of the use of falconry. The skeleton of an individual was found in a burnt-out house, his arms apparently extended towards one of these bird heads. Other animals are modeled in clay, carved or engraved on stone vases: wild boars, snakes, lions, and foxes at Hallan Çemi in southeastern Anatolia. Human figures were also made. The wild ox, though occasionally hunted, is nowhere to be seen except in Hallan Çemi: one house contains the skull and horns of a wild aurochs, which were once hung on the wall. The subjects are similar to those of objects from Mureybet in Syria and Cafer Höyük in Turkey. Other objects found at Nemrik include stone pendants of various shapes, malachite beads, stone representations of sexual organs, and river shell ornaments.

At Qermez Dere, archaeologists have noted one or two pairs of clay stelae whose function does not appear to be to support the roofs of houses. These stelae could have a symbolic meaning, suggesting that both ritual and domestic activities took place in the houses.

Qermez Dere and Nemrik show some evidence of ritual: in particular, the deliberate preservation of human skulls carried into each house in the late period of both villages. This indicates ancestor worship and early recognition of the house as a "family home," confirming the sedentary nature of the region's inhabitants and underscoring the solidarity between members of the same family. A cemetery from the last phase of occupation at Nemrik contains burial objects, but also flint projectile points embedded in the bones of some of the bodies - clear evidence of violent deaths.

== The beginnings of agriculture ==
Around 7500 BC, the Neolithic movement continued with the arrival of the first agricultural hunters, who organized themselves into villages in the high valleys of the Tigris and Zagros. These Neolithic pottery villages, whose economy was based on both hunting and agriculture, were larger, housed more people for longer periods of time, and their architecture was more substantial. However, agriculture appeared very gradually: the first traces of domesticated plants were discovered only towards the end of the PPNB (early 7th millennium BC). Before that, the inhabitants of these villages intensively harvested wild plants with sickles, equipped themselves to crush the seeds and put them in containers. In addition, certain animals, especially goats, were domesticated at most sites.

Despite an established network of trade between the Tigris valleys, the Zagros, and even Anatolia (the use of obsidian is one of the main indicators of this), it seems that the Zagros populations followed a development independent of that of the first farmers in Turkey, to the north, or those to the west of the Fertile Crescent: their lithic industry seems to be the heir of that of the M'lefaat and Nemrik villages of the preceding period. There are, however, two points common to all sites of this period: the mixed economy and the fact that the houses became rectangular.

In the Zagros, which seems to have been a Neolithic center in its own right, the appearance of agriculture is illustrated by the sites of Bestansur and Chogha Golan. The main witness of the occupation of the Tigris valley is the site of Tell Maghzaliyah, the remains of a village located not far from Qermez Dere and related to those of the Balikh valley.

It was also at the sites of Tell Maghzaliyah and Seker al-Aheimar (of the same cultural type from the Taurus Mountains, located in the Khabur Valley) that the first decorated pottery was discovered, dating to the end of the 8th millennium BC, thus establishing a link between the last PPNB and the beginning of the so-called "Proto-Hassuna" period.

=== Southern Mesopotamia ===
During the 8th and 7th millennia BC, the landscape of southern Mesopotamia seems to have been a collection of constantly fluctuating marsh lands alongside more arid areas, the whole presenting a landscape generally comparable to that in which the Marsh Arabs live today. It is possible that many of the remains of this period, located near the rivers (which were major settlement areas), still exist today but are inaccessible because they are buried under the alluvial deposits of the Tigris, Euphrates, and their numerous tributaries and wadis, if they have not been simply eroded by them. Some of them also lie beneath the remains of historical eras that are currently being explored. Some sites, such as Hadji Muhammed and Ras al Amiya, were discovered by accident during modern construction.

In the desert areas west of the vast wadi systems, which are now drained and dry, archaeologists have uncovered evidence of flint industries similar to those in the late Levant, with parallels to the flint industries of northern Arabia. These industries are perhaps characteristic of the Gulf region, which was still arid at the time - and undoubtedly influenced by a monsoon climate. In addition, "Mesolithic" lithic tools (with microliths, burins, scrapers) dating roughly to pre-Neolithic times have been found during surface surveys in the Burgan Hills of Kuwait. But when it comes to the first prehistoric populations to the west and south of what would become Sumer, researchers can only speculate.

=== A hearth in the Zagros ===
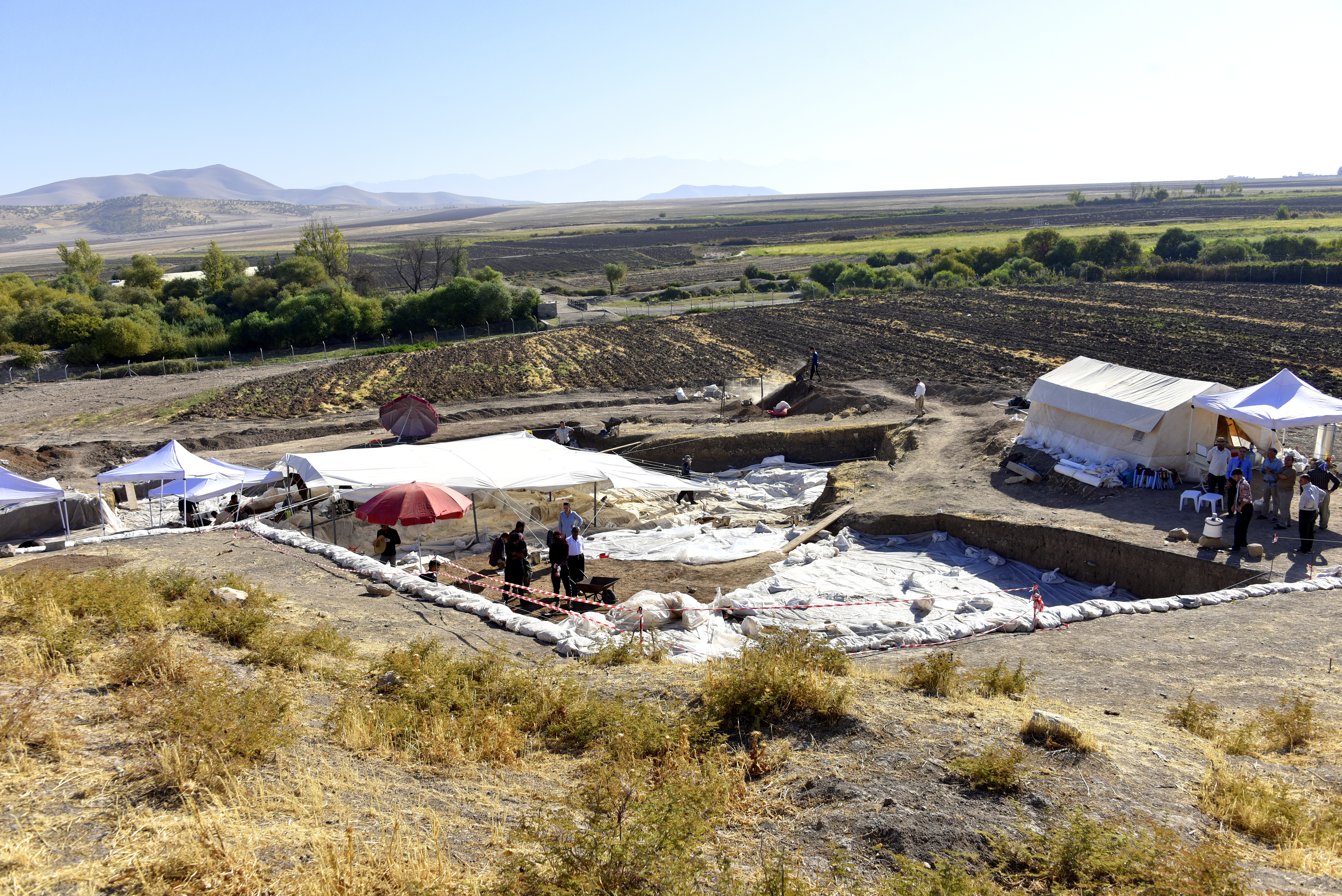
The Bestansur excavation site in October 2021

Excavated between 2012 and 2017, the Bestansur site is located in the foothills of the Zagros Mountains on the edge of the Shahrizor Plain, 30 kilometers southeast of the city of Sulaymaniyah. Geographically close, but older than Jarmo, the village survived between 8000 BC and 7100 BC. The inhabitants enjoy a wide range of ecological opportunities, including fertile arable land, water sources, hilly and mountainous terrain suitable for hunting a variety of animals and harvesting a variety of plants, not to mention the proximity of several stone deposits suitable for the manufacture of polished and carved stone tools.

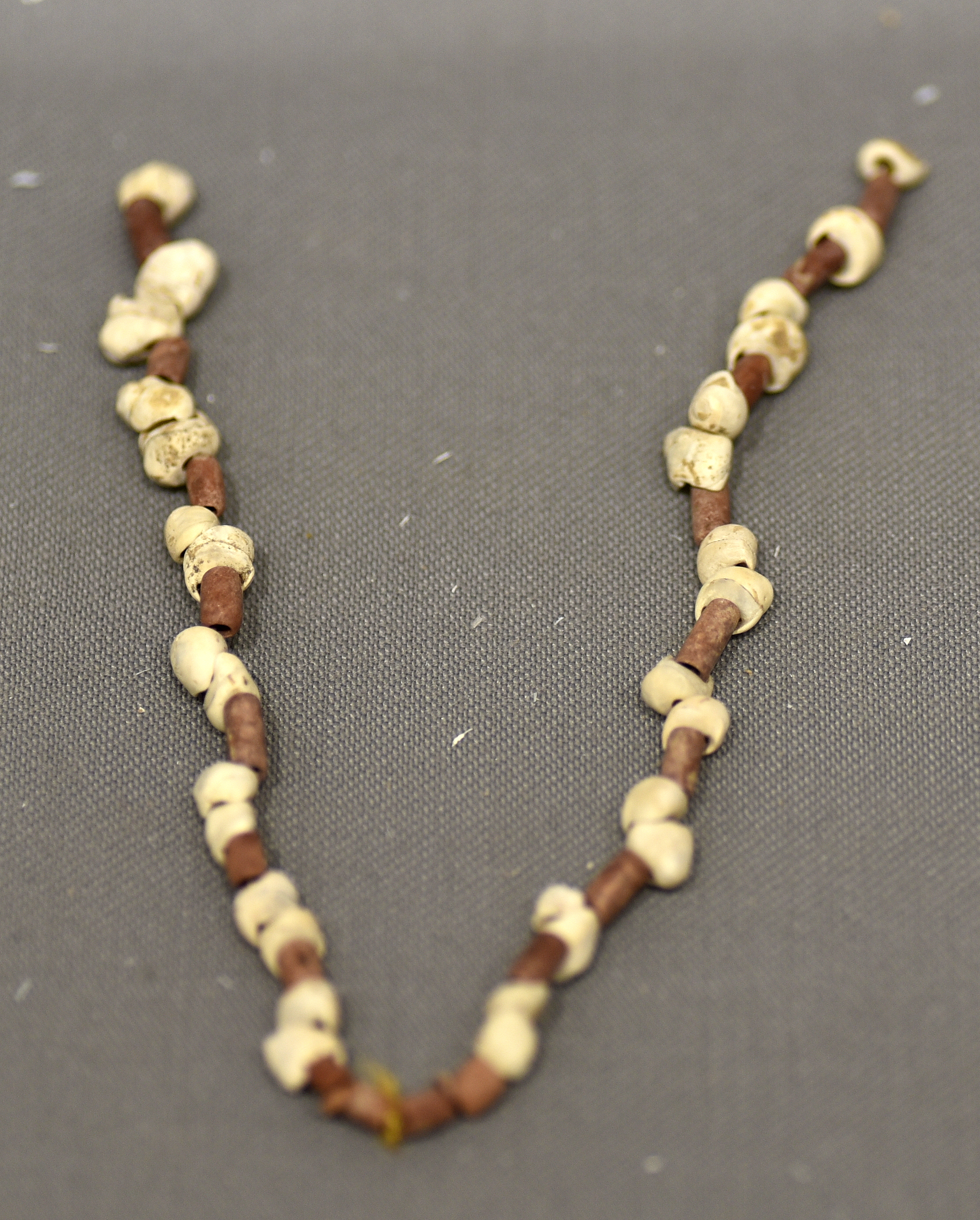
Necklace made of white stones and cornelians found at the Neolithic site of Bestansur. Iraq (7800–7500 BC). Museum of Sulaymaniyah - Iraq.

The architecture of Bestansur was characterized by rectilinear, multi-room adobe buildings. Not all of these buildings appear to have been used for habitation: one was devoted entirely to burying the dead. The bodies, often dismembered, were probably exhumed and certain parts, especially skulls, removed for reburial in the dwellings. This "house of the dead" provides a wealth of information on the difficulties faced by the inhabitants, probably linked to the Neolithic transition: numerous skeletons of children and adolescents highlight serious problems of malnutrition and nutritional stress in early life.

Nevertheless, this dietary stress occurred despite a high level of biodiversity that should have reduced dependence on a number of Neolithic plants and thus limited the risks associated with early agriculture and the early exploitation of animals such as domestic goats, sheep, and pigs. Again, some form of hunting of small and large mammals persisted, as did the consumption of fish, poultry, and land snails, important components of the diet.

Chogha Golan is one of the oldest known Neolithic sites in Iran. Excavated in 2009 and 2010, it covers an area of about 3 hectares and 11 levels of occupation from the Ceramic Neolithic (between 12,000 and 9,800 BP calibrated) have been attributed to the site. The occupation of the site has left abundant and diverse archaeological remains: traces of plastered walls, lithic industry, stone crockery, engraved bone objects and clay figurines. The animal remains are very varied: goats, wild boars, gazelles, wild donkeys, cattle, hares, rodents, birds and fish, etc.

The abundant botanical remains document the beginnings of agriculture and show that it appeared over a very long period of time. Here, as in Bestansur, wild varieties of some of the basic Neolithic crops, barley, wheat, lentils and peas, were found in the vicinity of the site at the time of occupation. Again, various studies on the evolution of domesticated plants indicate that the Zagros was one of the hotbeds of plant domestication, along with the northern and southern Levant.

=== Tell Maghzaliyah and the Belikh Valley ===
The settlement of the Tigris valleys is mainly documented by the site of Tell Maghzaliyah, the remains of a village dating from the end of the 8th millennium BC, located not far from Qermez Dere, in a wadi on the edge of the Jebel Sinjar mountain range, whose cultural affiliation brings it closer to the cultures that characterize the late PPNB of the northern Levant and the Belikh Valley in northern Syria, where some twenty-four sites, including Tell Sabi Abyad, have been discovered. The inhabitants of these villages belonged to the typical PPNB cultural facies of Cafer Höyük or Çayönü and originated from the Taurus Mountains and other regions of Anatolia. Their economy is based on both hunting and agriculture, a well-established feature of the entire Belikh Valley, where wheat and barley are grown and sheep and goats are raised.

Unlike the ancient round houses of Qermez Dere and Nemrik, which were built around a common area, the buildings at Tell Maghzaliyah, all of which are clearly residential, are rectangular, with mud walls built on a foundation of limestone slabs and filled with stones. There are both storage and kitchen-living areas, and one of the houses has a chimney with an external flue, similar to later houses at Umm Dabaghiyah and Çatal Höyük. As in Nemrik, the final phases of the village show a wall flanked by towers surrounding the houses, indicating possible conflicts with neighbors.

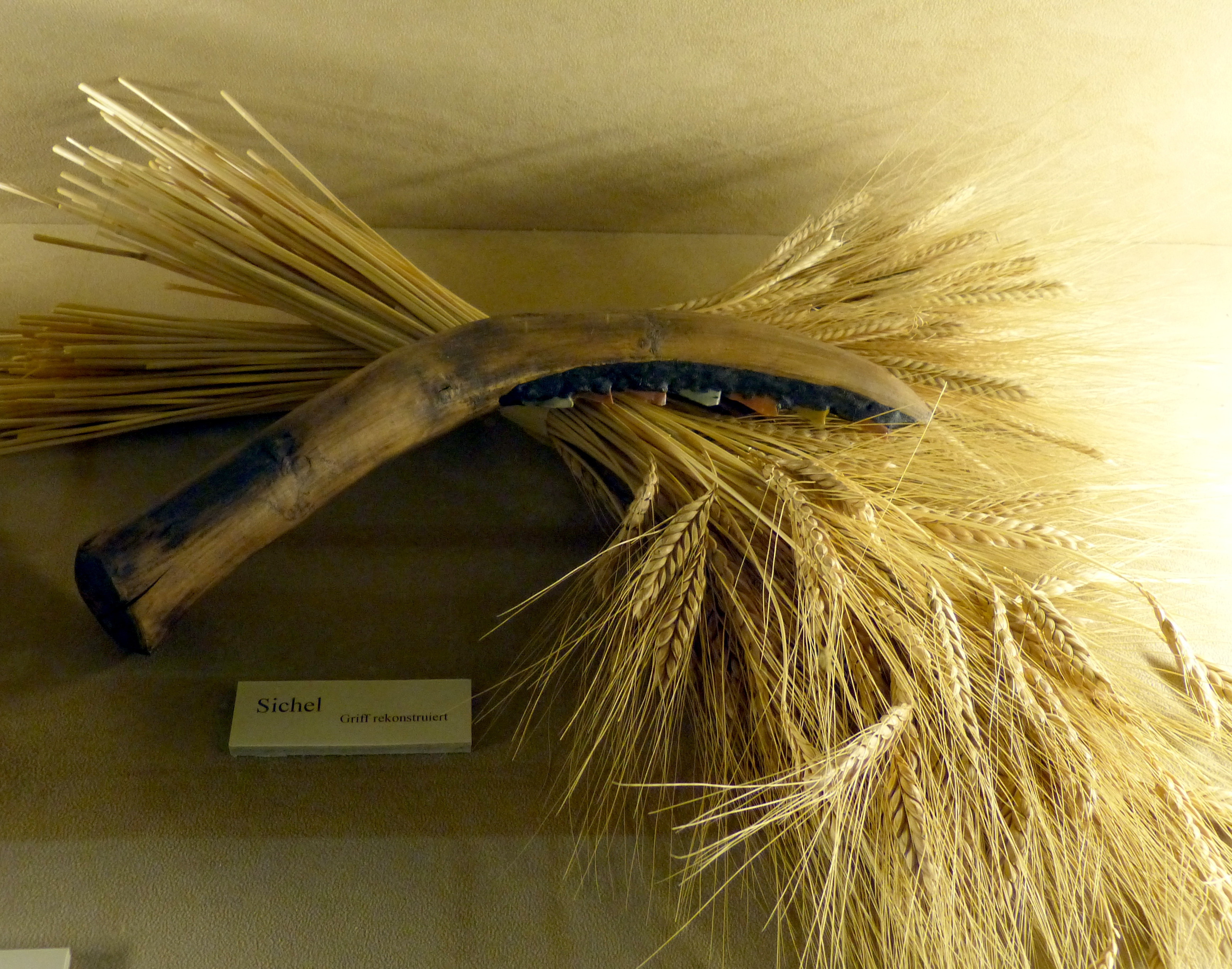
Reconstruction of a Neolithic sickle. Blade-shaped stones are held in place with natural bitumen. Vienna Museum of Natural History.

Like Nemrik, the early levels of Tell Maghzaliyah show a predominance of obsidian, despite the remoteness of the nearest deposits in Anatolia, from where the chipping technique was imported. The site also contains projectile points, both leaf-shaped and knives, as well as clockwise rotating drills. Tell Sabi Abyad II, Byblos, and Amuq points were found in the upper levels of a site in the Belikh Valley. Flint scrapers, later used during the Hassuna period, are already present. Bitumen-coated sickles have also been found at Tell Maghzaliyah and other villages in the Belikh Valley, the blades of which show traces of grain harvesting. The inhabitants also left behind marble bowls, bracelets, and polished punches. Although the village of Tell Maghzaliyah is still pottery based, plaster tableware and decorated pottery are also used. These can be found throughout Jezirah and the Syrian Desert, especially at Seker al-Aheimar.

=== Seker al-Aheimar and the "Pre-Proto-Hassuna" period ===
Seker al-Aheimar is a large Mesopotamian site of about 4 hectares and is the only one that provides information on the transition from PPNB to Proto-Hassuna pottery. The acetate levels of the PPNB village show small rectangular buildings on a paved platform of a type already encountered at Tell Maghzaliyah. The use of lime plaster on brick walls was common. While some aspects of the utilitarian stone industry at Seker al-Aheimar resemble that of the Zagros, the end scrapers, burins, polished axes, and arrowhead types common at the end of the PPNB resemble those found in the Belikh Valley. Decorative objects include gypsum vessels as well as stone and Anatolian obsidian beads.

The most important discovery, however, is that of numerous stone vessels, white pottery and, above all, an early type of watertight vessel, which is the oldest form of pottery found in all of North and Central Mesopotamia. Fired on a low, temperate fire, which is characteristic of the first ceramic Neolithic, this pottery has a dense, granular consistency and is very different from the future "Proto-Hassuna" pottery. For researchers Yoshihiro Nishiaki and Marie Le Mière, this discovery demonstrates the existence of an early ceramic phase - represented by a cultural entity provisionally referred to as "Pre-Proto-Hassuna" - which appears to have begun in the Middle PPNB and ended in the Proto-Hassuna, introducing the latter.

== The rise of farming communities ==
Major Near Eastern Ceramic (or Late) Neolithic sites, circa 7000 BC – 5500 BC

During the Ceramic Neolithic (c. 7000 to 5000 BC), agricultural communities increasingly occupied Mesopotamia. Villages were established in the drier climate of Lower Mesopotamia, indicating the development of irrigation systems. This does not mean, however, that Lower Mesopotamia was unoccupied before the 7th millennium BC. Remains of earlier settlements may be difficult to access, buried in deep layers of silt or simply destroyed by intense river erosion on the plains. The most important settlements in central Mesopotamia are Bouqras, near the Euphrates, not far from the Iraqi border in eastern Syria, Tell es-Sawwan, south of Samarra on the Tigris, the sites of Umm Dabaghiyah in the steppe west of Hatra and Choga Mami at the eastern end of the Mesopotamian plain, at the foot of the Zagros Mountains east of Baghdad.

At the beginning of this period (up to 6500 BC), the first decorated ceramics appeared, notably at Bouqras, Tell es-Sawwan and Umm Dabaghiyah. These were perfected until the beginning of the Chalcolithic period. Historians distinguish several cultures in relation to these painted ceramics: those of Hassuna, Samarra, Halaf and Ubaid, the names of the archaeological sites where they were first discovered. In the early centuries, ceramics were first partially decorated with the line incisions, wavy patterns or raised lozenges characteristic of the Hassuna culture. Then they became finer and finer, completely covered with geometric paintings, and more complex with representations of stylized natural elements such as plants or birds for the Samarra and Halaf cultures. Although the production of painted pottery disappeared at the same time as the use of the first pictographic signs, these decorations cannot be considered as a means of transmitting language, as is the case with writing. However, they are probably a code or pictorial language whose meaning has been lost.

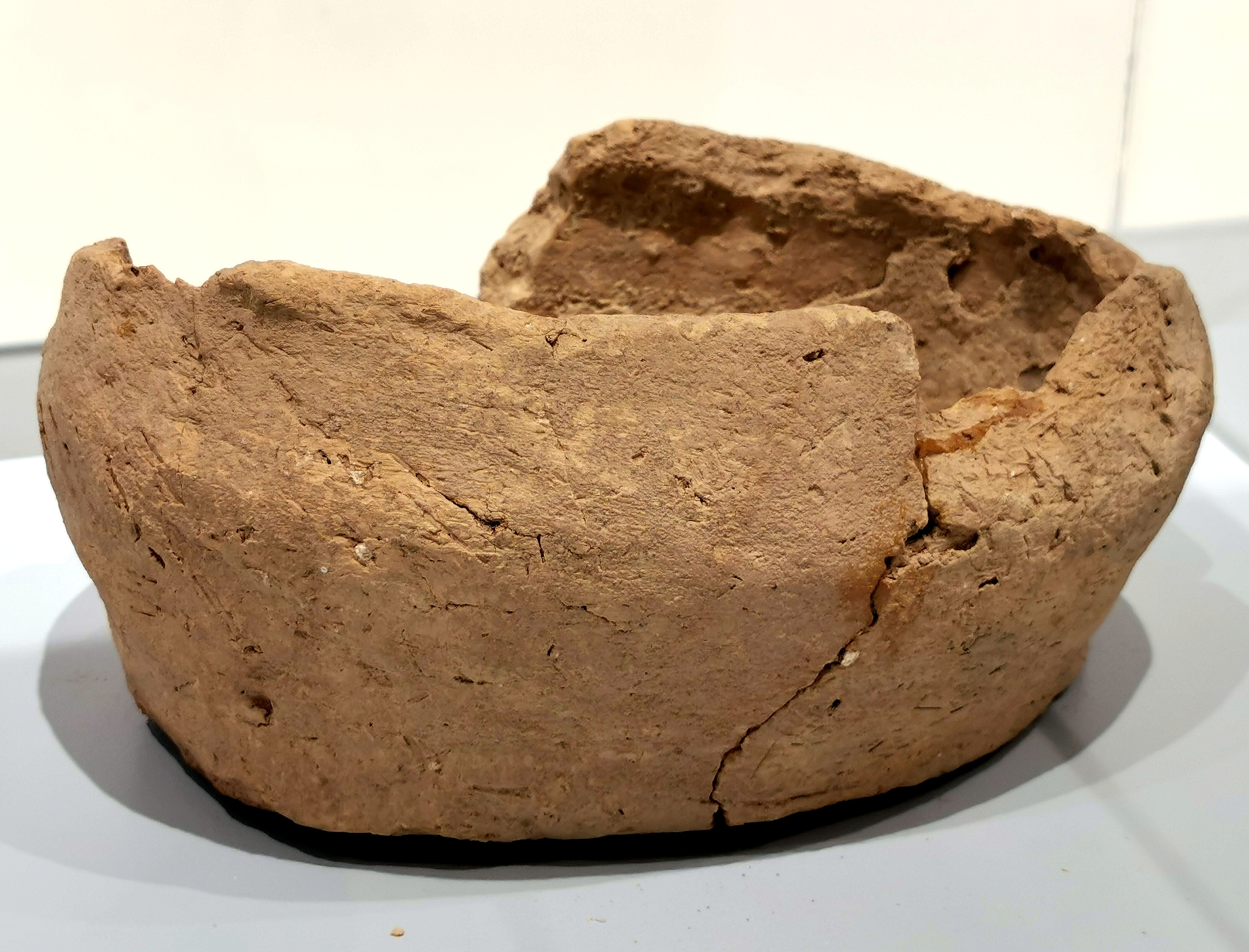
Terracotta bowl from Jarmo. Sulaymaniyah Museum.

In the Zagros, communities seem to have diverged somewhat from those in the Mesopotamian lowlands. Jarmo is a case in point. It's a village located on the western outskirts of the Zagros, on a hill in the Chemchemal valley in north-eastern Iraq. It was originally excavated in the 1940s and 1950s by archaeologist Robert John Braidwood to investigate the origins of agriculture. The village consists of mud-brick houses with several rooms connected by low doorways. A type of foundation known from Çayönü has been identified in the form of a grid. The large number of clay figurines found in Jarmo probably indicates a local specialty: over 5,500 figurines and about 5,000 clay tokens have been found there. However, the low-fired "tadpole" pottery proved to be quite different from that of the Proto-Hassuna culture found at sites in the Mesopotamian lowlands, while other examples of this pottery are found further east. This seems to indicate a cultural demarcation between the Zagros and the Mesopotamian lowlands from this period onwards.

In Upper Mesopotamia, the treatment of the dead prior to the expansion of the Ubaid culture in the 5th millennium BC varied in manner and location. It ranged from simple burials accompanied by a few objects to disarticulated bodies whose skulls were given special treatment, such as burial in a ceramic urn. Moreover, although the evidence is weak, it seems that some communities practiced burial outside the village: burials have been found on the top of the mound of Yarim Tepe (a village abandoned when the dead were deposited). At Tell Sabi Abyad, a village that was deliberately burned down, archaeologists found two skeletons that appeared to be lying on the roof of a house; this was undoubtedly an elaborate ritual in which the dead played a central role. At Domuztepe in southeastern Anatolia, the Death Pit is a mortuary complex containing the intentionally fragmented remains of at least forty individuals. Researchers see it as a transformation of the dead into a reconstituted collective ancestor. Cannibalism and human sacrifice are also possible.

Around 6500 BC, the use of copper, the appearance of seals, irrigation, wall paintings, the first sanctuaries, increasingly obvious social divisions, and increasingly complex management of society were noted. In addition, the first rectangular-shaped bricks and the first buttresses inside and outside walls, previously observed at Cafer Höyük, appear mainly at Samarra, Bouqras, and to a lesser extent at Tell-Hassuna.

=== The Proto-Hassuna phase ===
Umm Dabaghiyah, occupied for three or four centuries, located in the Iraqi Jezireh between the Tigris and Euphrates rivers, much better irrigated in the 7th millennium BC than today, provides the most complete documentation of the Proto-Hasna phase (c. 7000 BC – 6500 BC). The population of Umm Dabaghiyah, undoubtedly the heir to the Syrian PPNB, still operated a mixed economy, with the evening primrose being hunted primarily for its skin and meat. This may be a seasonal site. However, wheat, lentils, and barley were present, as well as typical marsh plants, suggesting the presence of nearby salt marshes and shallow lakes in the area. Wall paintings suggest that the fast-moving onagers were caught in nets.

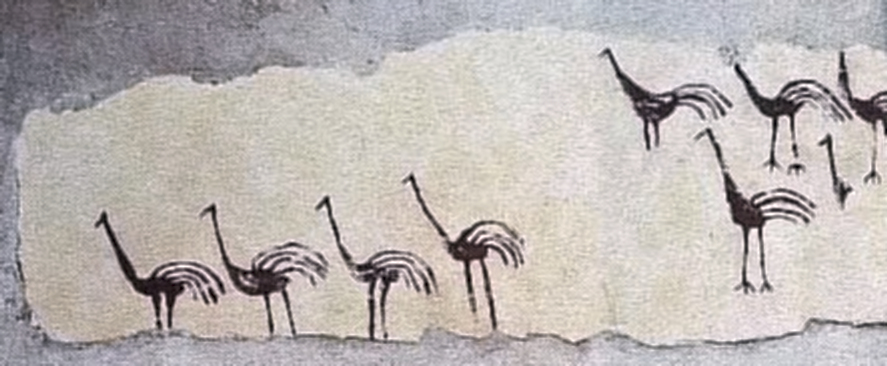
Neolithic wall painting from Tell Bouqras in the Deir ez-Zor museum

The buildings at Umm Dabaghiyah show indentations in the walls, suggesting that they were accessed through the roofs. These buildings, with their generally very small rooms, have internal plaster fireplaces associated with external ovens, suggesting cold winters (as in modern times in the region), unless this device was used to dry evening primrose skins. Some of the buildings, built in long rows, appear to have been used for storage. Similar but shorter storage structures were found further north, at Yarim Tepe.

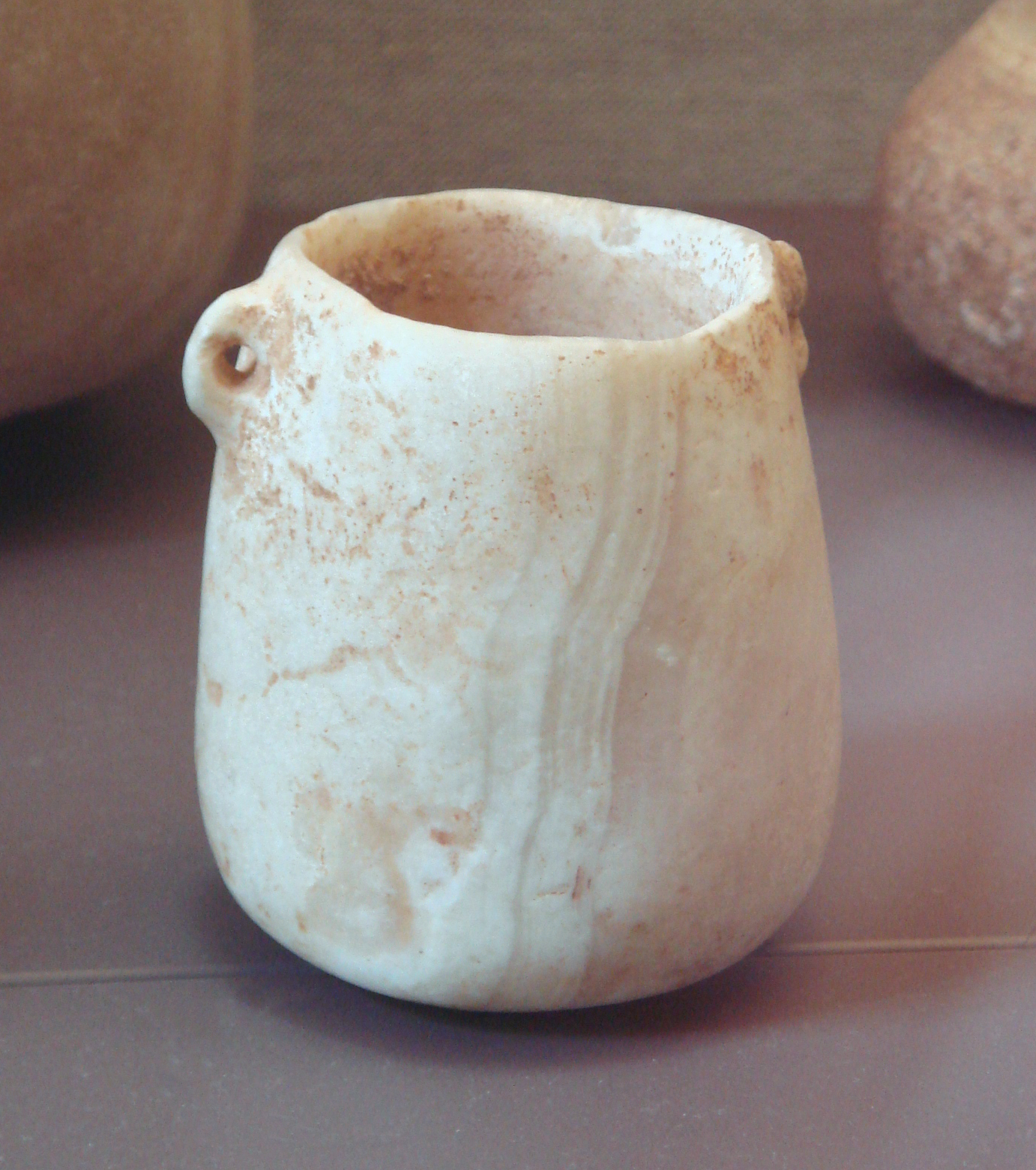
Alabaster pot with handles, Bouqras region 6500 BC Musée du Louvre

Compared to other sites, Umm Dabaghiyah does not have many examples of pottery. Moreover, it is very similar to the pottery of Bouqras, which seems to be related to it, in that it is simple: large jars or bowls painted in red ochre and sometimes decorated with rudimentary motifs such as bands, chevrons, or dots. However, Bouqras is a much larger village with clear origins in the Syrian PPNB. In addition to the typical Neolithic acetate material and ceramics previously described for Umm Dabaghiyah, finds include alabaster pots and paintings of ostriches or cranes painted in red ochre on some interior walls, all covered with plaster. These buildings, with three or four rows of rooms, are regular in plan and arranged along narrow streets in a coherent layout. Although there is no clear evidence yet, the size of some of the buildings and this layout suggest the establishment of a formal authority.

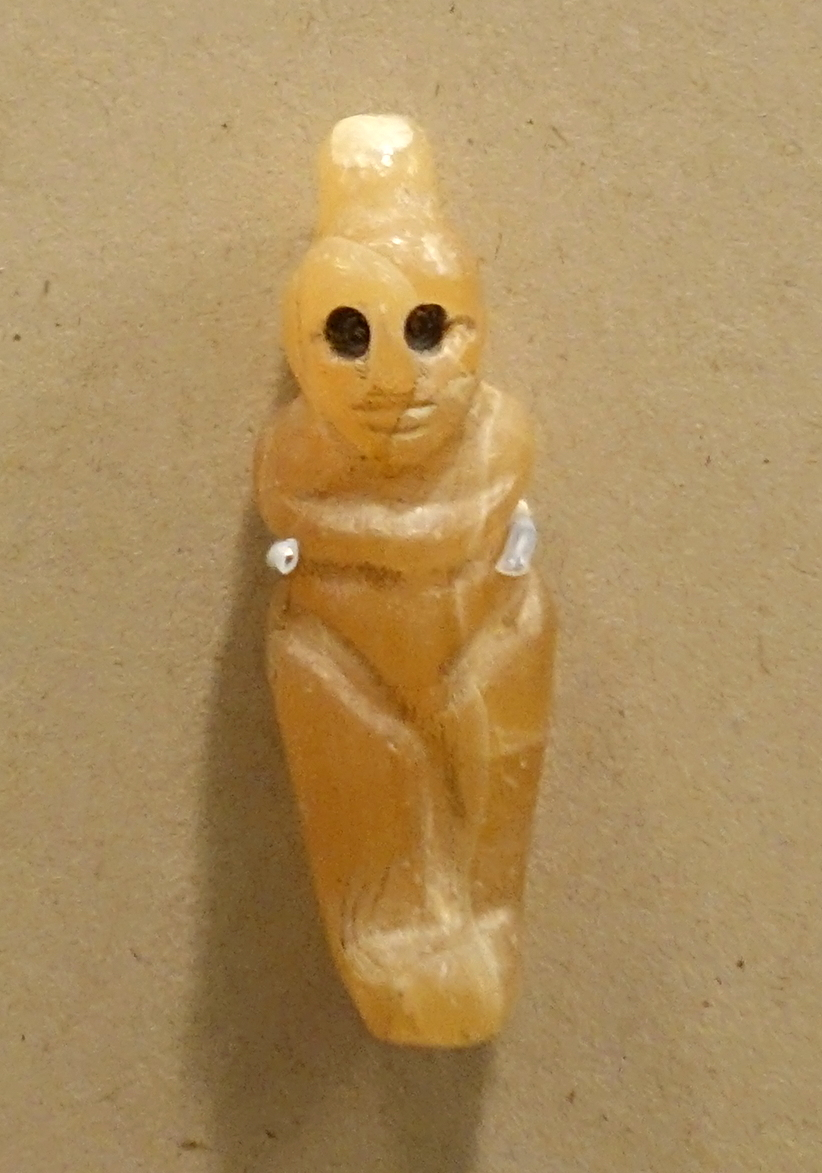
Alabaster figurine discovered at Tell-es-Sawwan with inlay of another material to emphasize the eyes. Oriental Institute Museum.

Pottery made with a technique similar to that of Umm Dabaghiyah and Bouqras, but in a different style, is also found, although more rarely, in Levels I and II of the Tell es-Sawwan site. (Note: Whether levels I and II of the Tell es Sawwan site belong to the proto-Hassuna or Hassuna period is still a matter of debate among archaeologists. In addition, there may still be a lower level, pushing back the - as yet unknown - origins of the village to an earlier period.) Sawwan is a 7th millennium BC village in Lower Mesopotamia on the Tigris River, about 80 km north of Baghdad. About 400 tombs have been discovered here, three-quarters of which contain infants. Many of the graves are missing bones. One, for example, contains only the bones of a child's hand, suggesting that some bodies may have been moved to other gravesites. Beneath the tombs is an enormous amount of alabaster objects: vases, figurines, and miscellaneous items. All of these objects are specific to the Tell es-Sawwan site: some figurines have inlays of other materials, such as shells or stones of different colors, often highlighting the eyes. Depending on how they are arranged in relation to the tombs, researchers have inferred significant social differentiation between individuals. A few clay and alabaster figurines found outside the tombs may have been associated with funerary rituals. Most of the tombs were found under large, three-part buildings (known as "tripartite"), a structure that persisted well into Mesopotamian antiquity. However, some burials are located in other sectors and are clearly separated from any architecture, making it difficult to make a clear interpretation between "burials under dwellings" and "cemeteries".

The houses here are "tripartite", that is, they are composed of a central rectangular space, which is entered through one of its widths, giving access to a series of small rooms that surround it symmetrically along its length. At Tell es-Sawwan, these buildings are found empty of household goods, as if the inhabitants had left and taken everything with them. In fact, the site was probably abandoned and reoccupied after an estimated period of between 123 and 300 years.

The end of the Proto-Hassuna period also marked the first use of seals: at Hassuna, Bouqras and Sawwan, they introduced a practice that developed in Mesopotamia and still persists today as a "guarantee". The first seal impressions appear on small white lids, clearly identifying the "property" contained in the sealed container. By the end of the Samarra Period, these seals were widely used as "contractual" devices in central and northern Mesopotamia.

=== The Hassuna culture ===
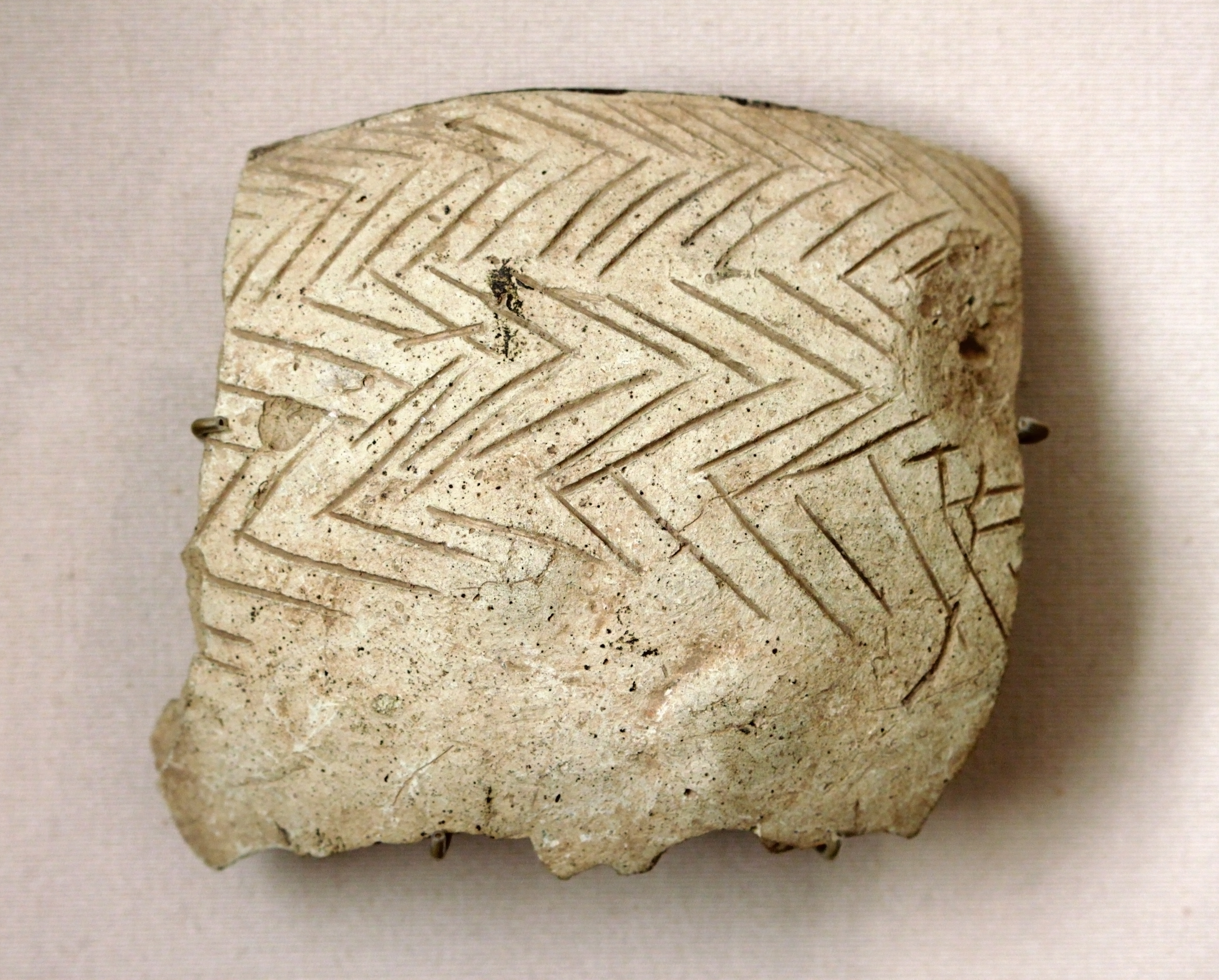
Pottery fragment with incised decoration. Tell Hassuna, 6500 BC – 6000 BC Musée du Louvre.

The Hassuna culture (c. 6500 BC – 6000 BC) takes its name from an archaeological site, Tell Hassuna, located in central Jezirah, between the Tigris Valley and Jebel Sinjar, not far from modern-day Mosul. Yarim Tepe and Tulul eth-Thalathat, on the Jezirah plateau and the Kurdish foothills, are also part of the Hassuna profile. These villages survived throughout the 7th millennium BC in a rainy region where dry farming was possible. The inhabitants grow a wide variety of grains, lentils and peas. They raise cattle, goats, sheep and pigs, and hunt aurochs, gazelles and bears.

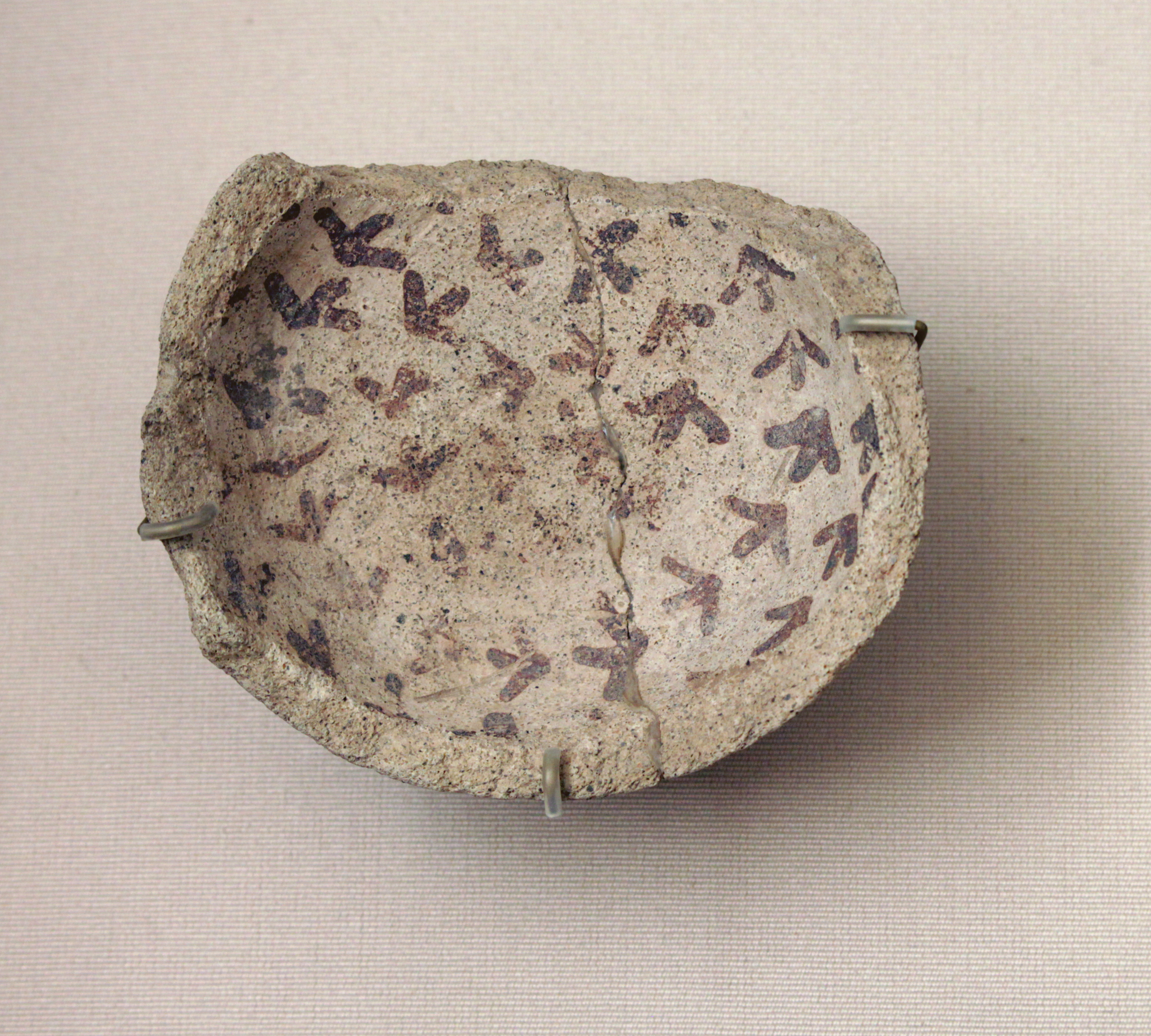
Fragment of pottery with painted decoration. Tell Hassuna, 6500 BC – 6000 BC Musée du Louvre.

Initially built of adobe, the walls of the multiroom houses were gradually built of molded brick. Houses were also built closer together and became more complex, with one house containing eleven rooms. The system of families grouped around collective granaries, which were considered to be the center of the settlement, was already in use in the North Mesopotamian Neolithic society of Tell Maghzaliyah and reached its full development during the Hassuna period. This system seems to have ensured community cohesion.

The Hassuna culture is characterized by very distinctive pottery, with motifs painted in red ochre or incised in parallel line networks and/or chevrons. This type of pottery is largely found in northern and central Mesopotamia, as well as in the Khabur region of northeastern Syria.

It is made by firing in large kilns. At Yarim Tepe, archaeologists have discovered the first well-preserved example of a pottery kiln consisting of two superimposed chambers separated by a wall with a smoke extraction system.

=== The Samarra culture ===
The Samarra Culture (c. 6200 BC – 5700 BC) is characterized by finely painted ceramics. Documented at Tell es-Sawwan and Choga Mami in central Mesopotamia, it is considered an evolution of the Hassuna Period ceramics and those of the Levantine corridor, whose villages were gradually depopulated. Archaeologists have also found evidence of Samarra pottery at a number of sites in northern Mesopotamia, as far away as the Syrian Jezirah and the Belikh Valley. Samarra pottery was easily recognizable and often elaborately decorated. Better made than its predecessors, it consists of large bowls and vases with rounded shoulders. Its light beige, slightly rough material is more harmonious. The decoration consists of geometric designs painted in bright red, brown, or purple-brown. These motifs can also represent men, women, birds, fish, antelopes, or scorpions. Some necklaces even have reliefs of human faces with stylized features. Pottery characteristic of this culture was also found at Tell el-Oueili, the oldest known village in southern Lower Mesopotamia, which documents the Ubaid period (Ubaid 0 phase, c. 6200 BC – 5900 BC).

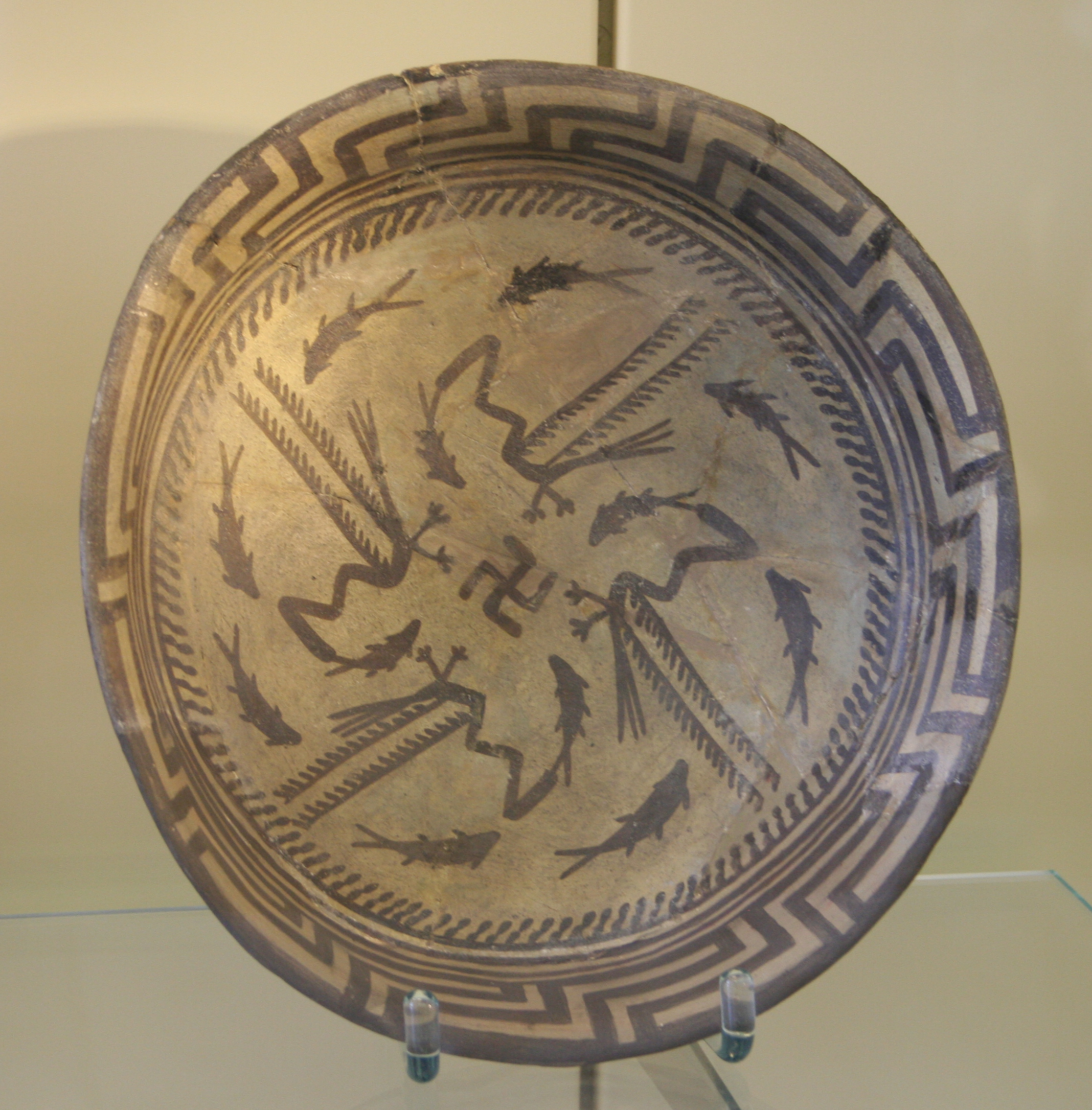
Painted dish from the Samarra period. Pergamonmuseum, Berlin.

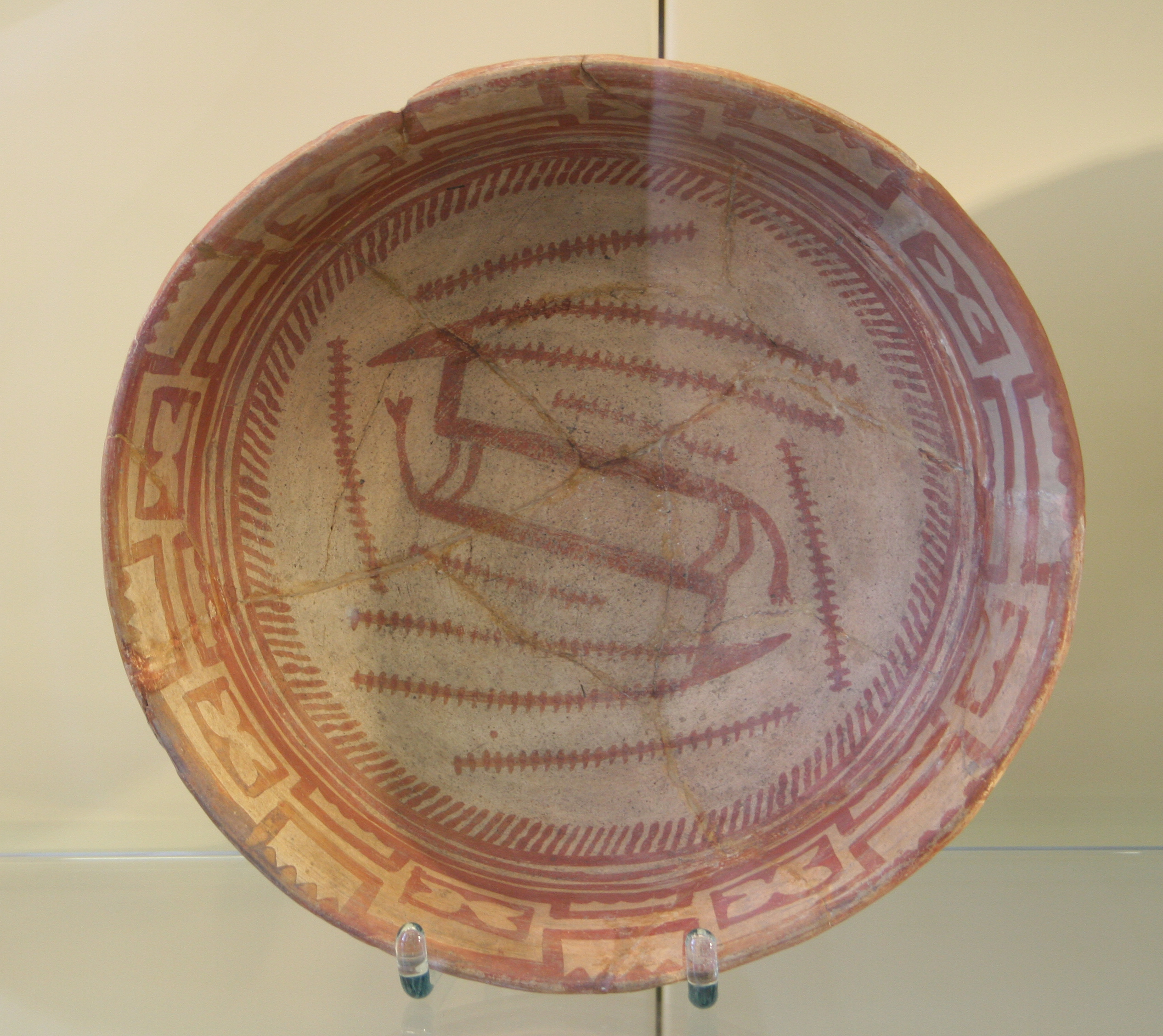
Painted dish from the Samarra period. Pergamonmuseum, Berlin.

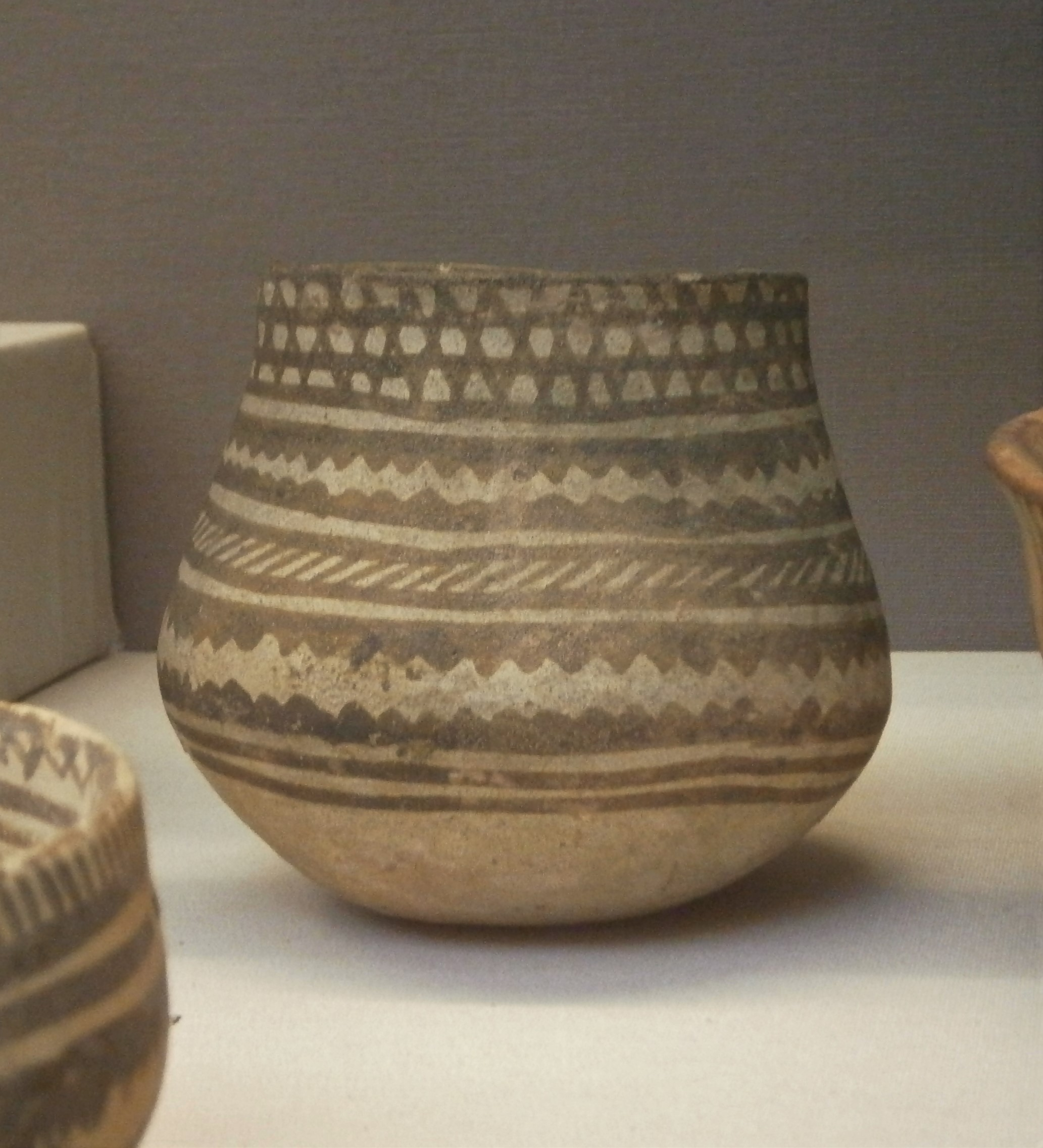
Jar with painted decoration from the Samarra culture, Samarra. British Museum, London.

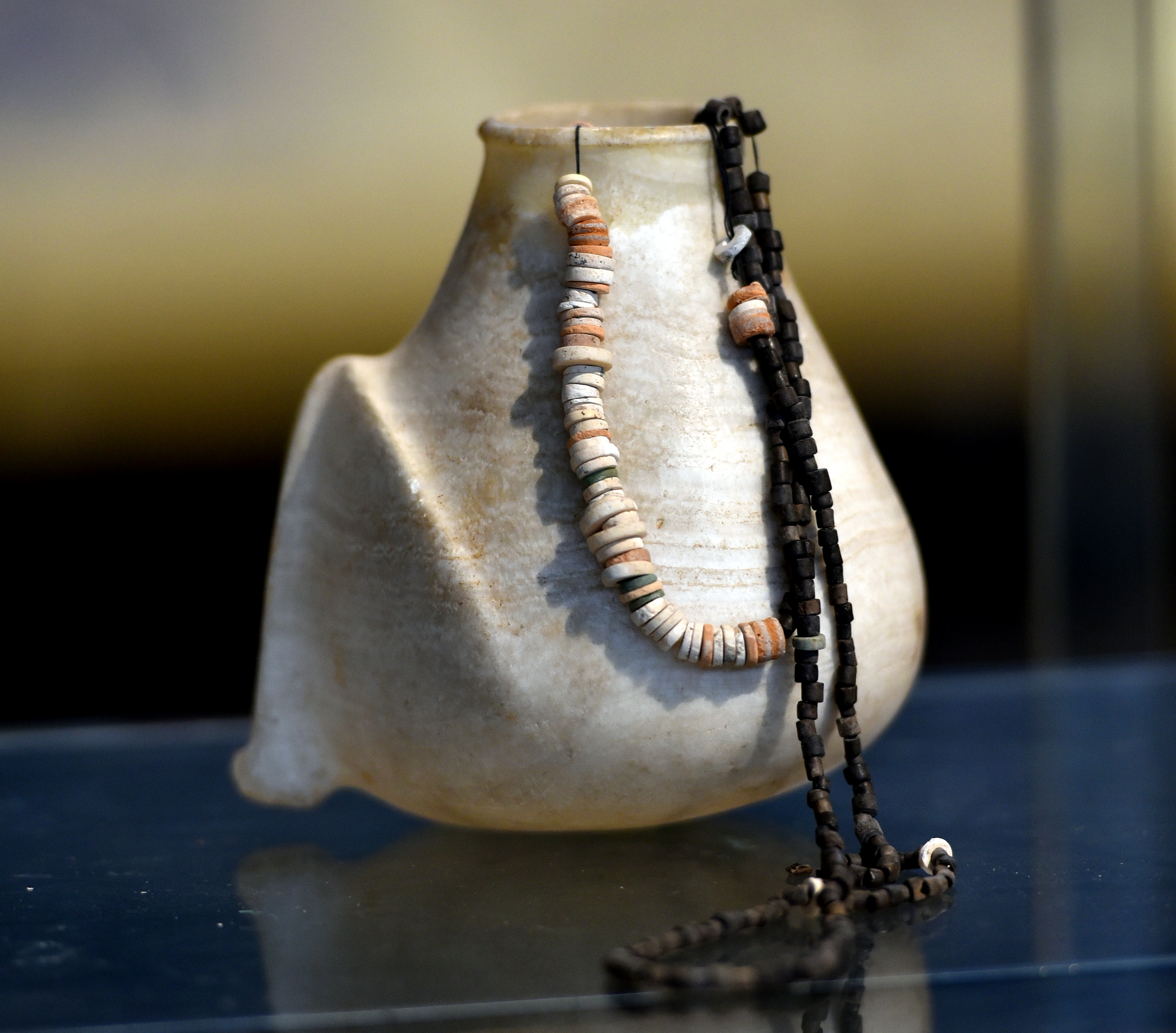
Alabaster vase and necklaces from Tell es-Sawwan, c. -6000 – -5800 National Museum of Iraq, Baghdad.

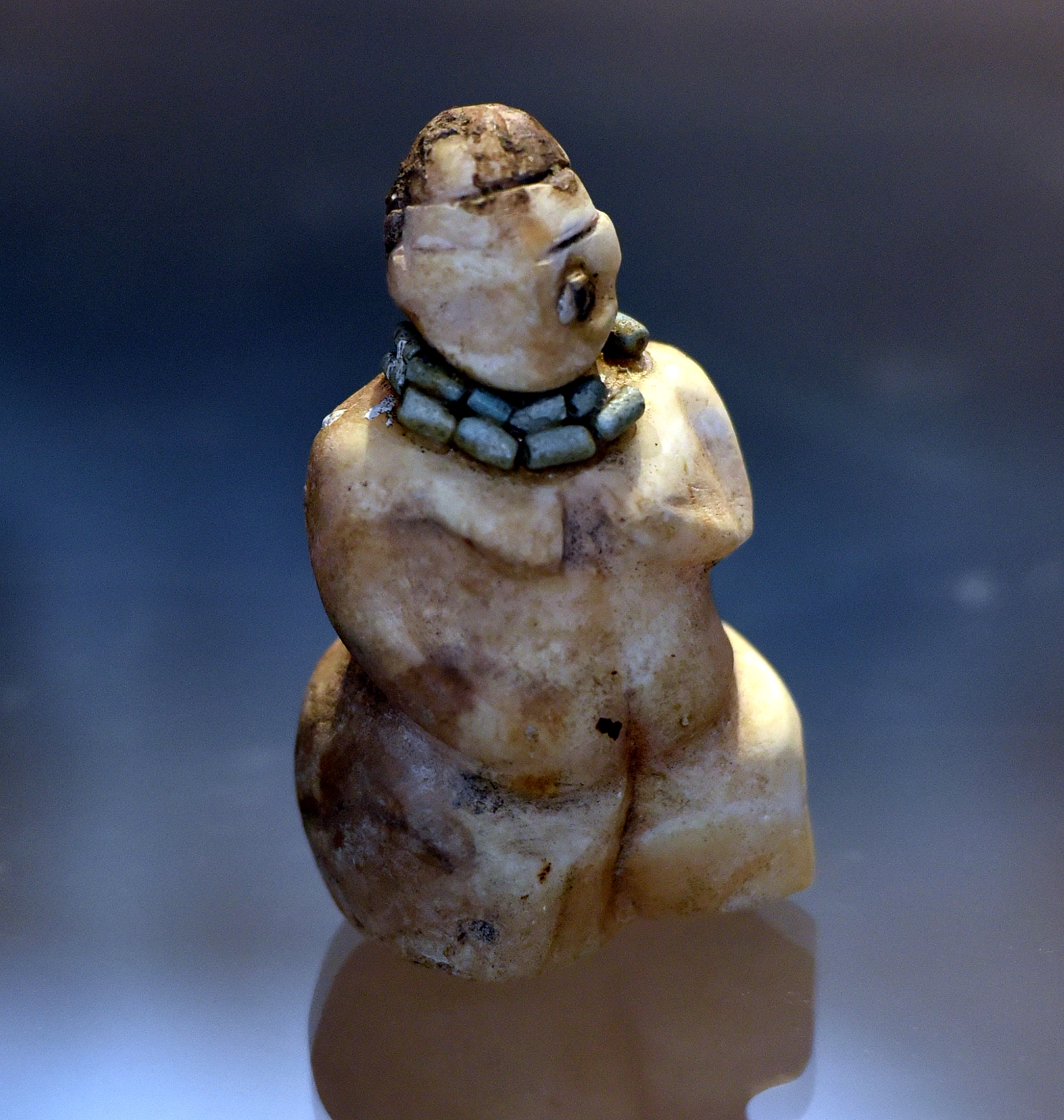
Female statuette from Tell es-Sawwan, Samarra period. National Museum of Iraq, Baghdad.

Samaritan statuettes were made of terracotta or alabaster. The figures are generally standing or crouching, and most are female. None of the figurines discovered at Choga Mami is intact: the heads are all broken and the presence of single legs with thin, flat inner surfaces suggests that the breakage was deliberate. Researchers believe that there was some kind of "contract" in place at the time the statues were broken. Some statuettes have elongated skulls and wide-open "coffee-bean" eyes. As in the Hassuna phase, the eyes and necklaces are often made of an external material, added or inlaid: the pupil is made of mother-of-pearl, and the thick, black eyebrows of bitumen. A technique reminiscent of future Sumerian production. These figurines seem to indicate a practice of cranial deformation - already attested in the pre-Ceramic Levant - which spread until the last phase of the Ubaid period. Such deformation can also be seen on some skeletons from the Ubaid phase at Eridu and Tell Arpachiah. This practice seems to have been carried out by a ruling class, no doubt seeking to demonstrate that they were no longer able to carry loads on their heads.

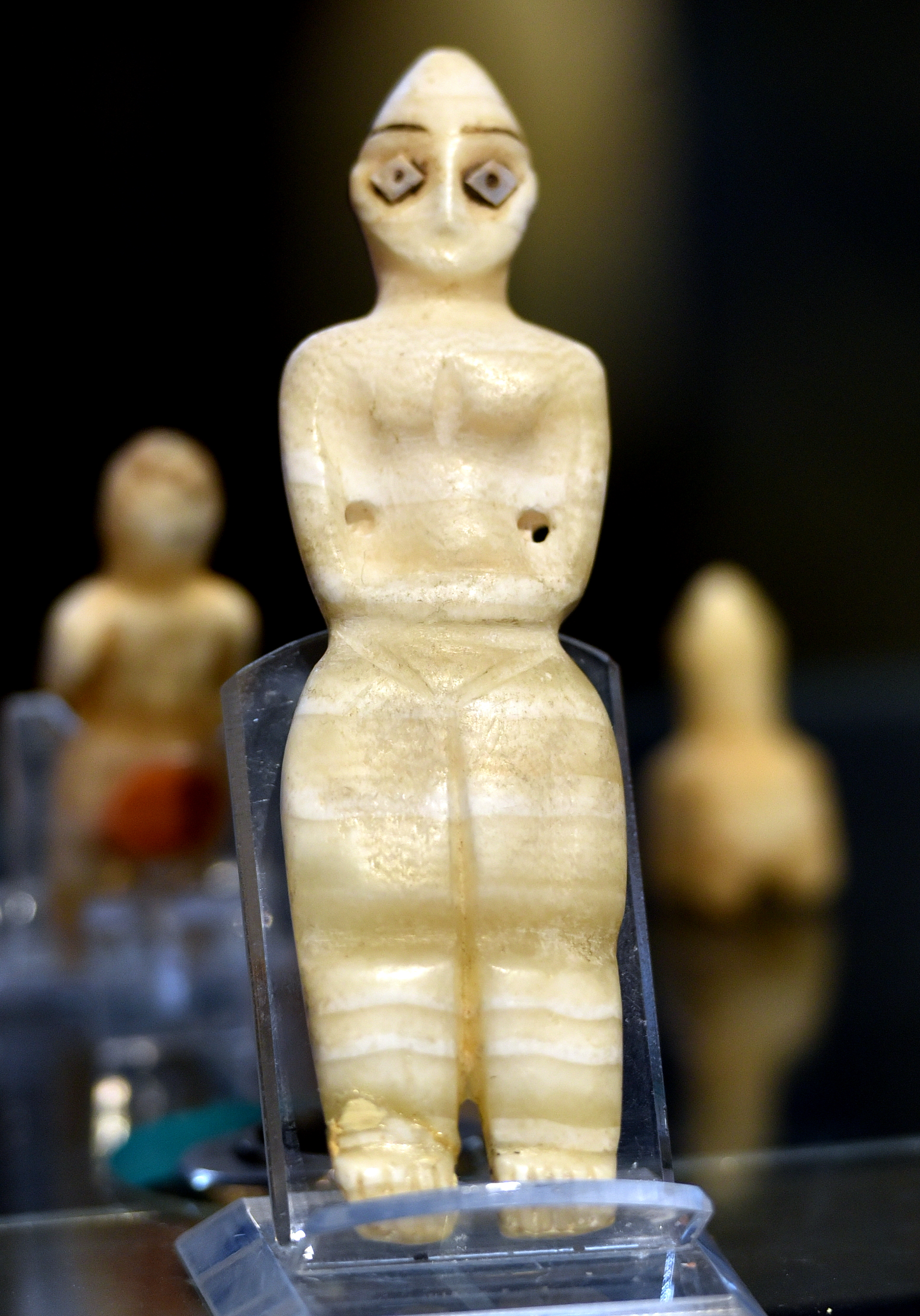
Female statuette from Tell es-Sawwan, Samarra period. The simple legs have thin, flat surfaces that probably leave the possibility of being broken. National Museum of Iraq, Baghdad.

Levels III and IV at Tell es-Sawwan confirm the use of the "tripartite" Mesopotamian house plan already discovered in the Hassuna period, but in the shape of a capital T. (Note: This can be seen from the various depredations the remains have suffered as a result of political and military disasters in Iraq, and the modern removal of soil by local farmers to fertilize their fields.) These levels were also characterized by Samarra-style pottery and a second type of building that appears to have served as a "granary". These levels were also characterized by Samarra-style pottery and by a second type of building that appears to have been used as a "granary", identified by its lime-covered floor and containing agricultural implements. All of these houses were surrounded by a mud-brick wall (also visible at Choga Mami) and a ditch, are composed of remarkably small rooms. This suggests the use of a flat roof for daily activities or implies the presence of a floor covering the entire surface, accessed by a staircase. The latter configuration could imply a division of activities between two levels: on the first floor are the service areas, storerooms, and workshops, where animal life takes place; on the first floor are the living quarters, a series of rooms, and various bedrooms. The use of molded mud bricks has been documented at Tell es-Sawwan, Bouqras, and Samarra. This method of construction (of which a few isolated earlier attempts are known) became widespread during the Samarra period. It allowed for the standardization and rationalization of construction according to a pre-established plan. It anticipates the architecture of the ziggurats and large buildings of historical Mesopotamia.

In the Samarra phase, the first Mesopotamian "public" buildings appear, evidence of social and religious activities. They can be considered the ancestors of Mesopotamian sanctuaries. The tombs below the last levels of Tell es-Sawwan contained funerary objects consisting mainly of pottery and clay figurines, in stark contrast to the tombs on the first levels.

Choga Mami, about 2 kilometers from the Iranian border, northeast of Baghdad, was built on an axis of communication along the Zagros Mountains, where water is available. Here the houses were built very close together, with large, separate courtyards, perhaps used as working areas. Samarra period inhabitants raised sheep and goats and hunted gazelle and aurochs. In arid southern Mesopotamia, farmers had to rely on irrigation to fertilize soils that were already prone to erosion and salinization. The first traces of irrigation canals were discovered at Choga Mami.

By the end of the Samarra period, seals and other "contractual" devices were more widely used in central and northern Mesopotamia. Only a small number of such seals appear in southern Mesopotamia, but this absence may be due to difficulties in exploring the sedimentary strata of the region.

=== The Halaf culture ===
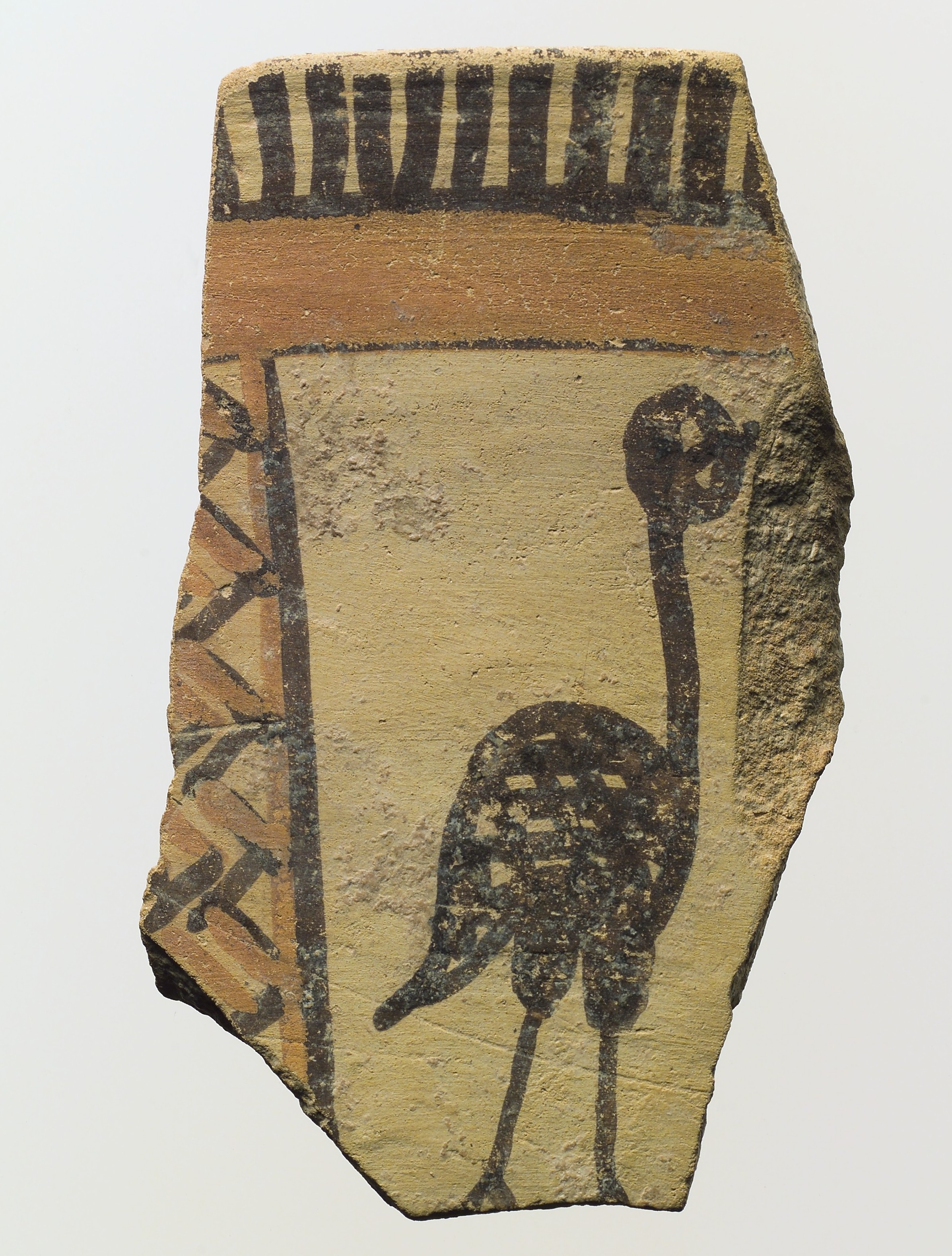
Broken pottery with bichrome decoration featuring a stylized bird in profile Metropolitan Museum of Art.

In Upper Jezirah and the rest of Upper Mesopotamia, the Halaf culture (c. 6100 BC – 5200 BC) developed alongside the Samarra culture. It was named after the site where the first examples of richly decorated pottery were discovered in 1929: the Tell Halaf site on the Turkish-Syrian border. Other sherds of this pottery were later discovered in Nineveh, Tell Arpachiyah (both on the outskirts of modern-day Mosul), and in many other places such as Chagar Bazar, Tepe Gawra, Yarim Tepe, also in northern Syria (Yunus Höyük), and in southeastern Anatolia at Domuztepe. Along with Anatolian obsidian, Halaf pottery is the most widely distributed of all types of ancient ceramics, found from the Zagros to the Mediterranean, a distance of about 1,200 kilometers. But it was in the Belikh valley, at the Tell Sabi Abyad site, that the earliest remains of this culture were discovered. It was here that late Samarra-type pottery, referred to here as "transitional Halaf", was discovered, which evolved into true early Halaf and thus determined the origin of the Halaf culture, originally thought to be located in northeastern Anatolia.

The Halaf culture is thus characterized by pottery that follows in the footsteps of that of Samarra, but is technically more sophisticated. So much so, in fact, that it attests to a much greater degree of specialization by the potters, which was already evident during the Samarra period. These potteries, with their very fine paste, were subjected to a hotter, more oxidizing firing process, giving them an orange or buff color. Shaped using a "tournette" (slow wheel turned by hand), the first rotary method of shaping ceramics, they are made from carefully selected local clays. They were generally fired in kilns with a round or oval base and an ascending draft. These were equipped with single-chamber kilns (pottery and fuel in the same chamber), which were gradually replaced by double-chamber kilns (pottery and fuel separated), which allowed a better distribution of heat in the objects being fired. Initially dominated by geometric motifs - triangles, squares, checkerboards, crosses, festoons, small circles, and cross-hatching - pottery decorations gradually took on more complex decorative schemes, including highly stylized plant and animal motifs such as resting birds, gazelles, and cheetahs. Other motifs are undoubtedly more religious, such as bucraniums (stylized bull heads), double axes, or "Maltese squares" (a square with a triangle at each corner). Excavations on the Euphrates have revealed black and red bichrome decorations and, in smaller numbers on the banks of the Khabur, polychrome decorations combining red, black, and white.

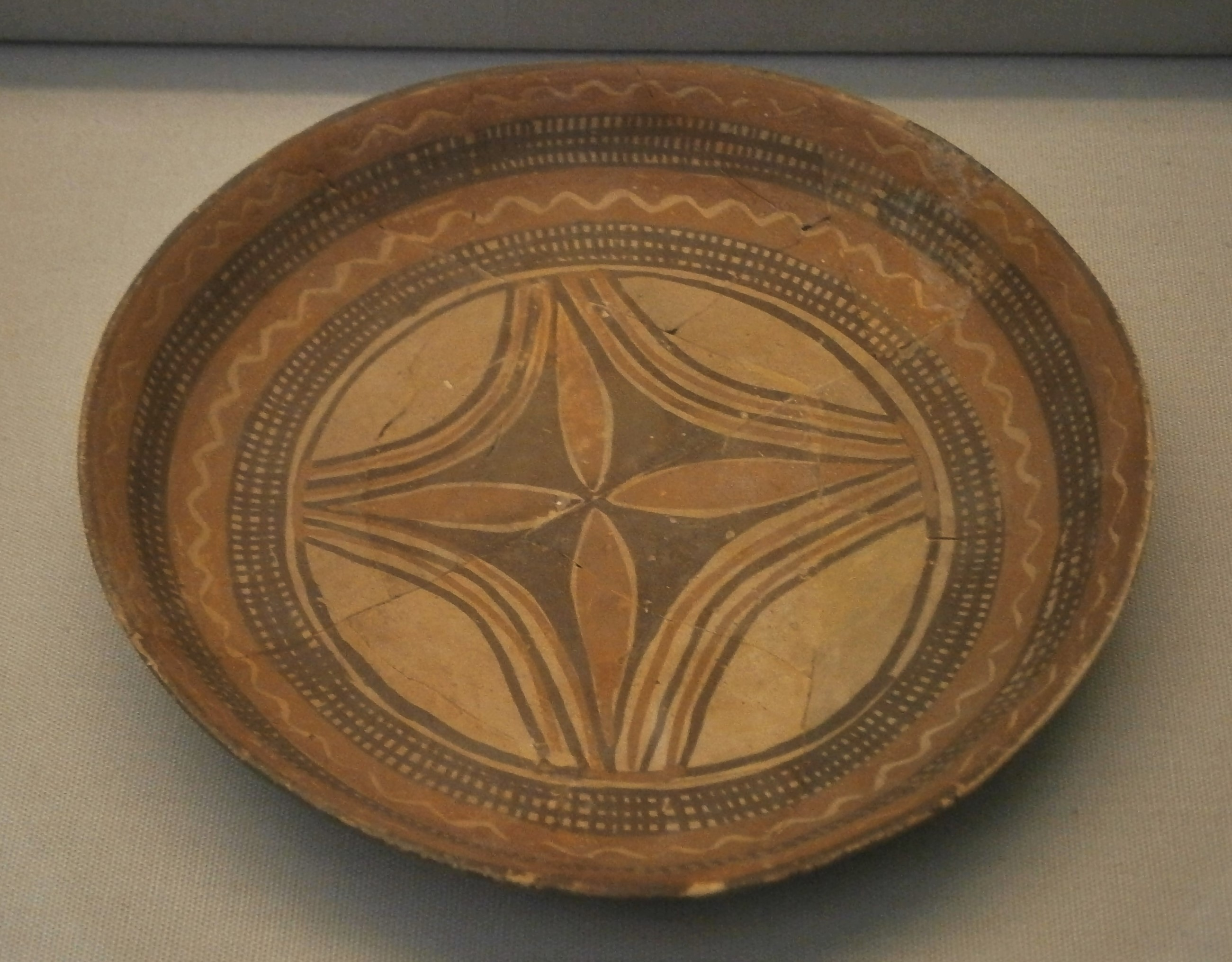
Dish with painted decoration, Late Halaf (c. 5600–5200 BC), Tell Arpachiyah. British Museum.

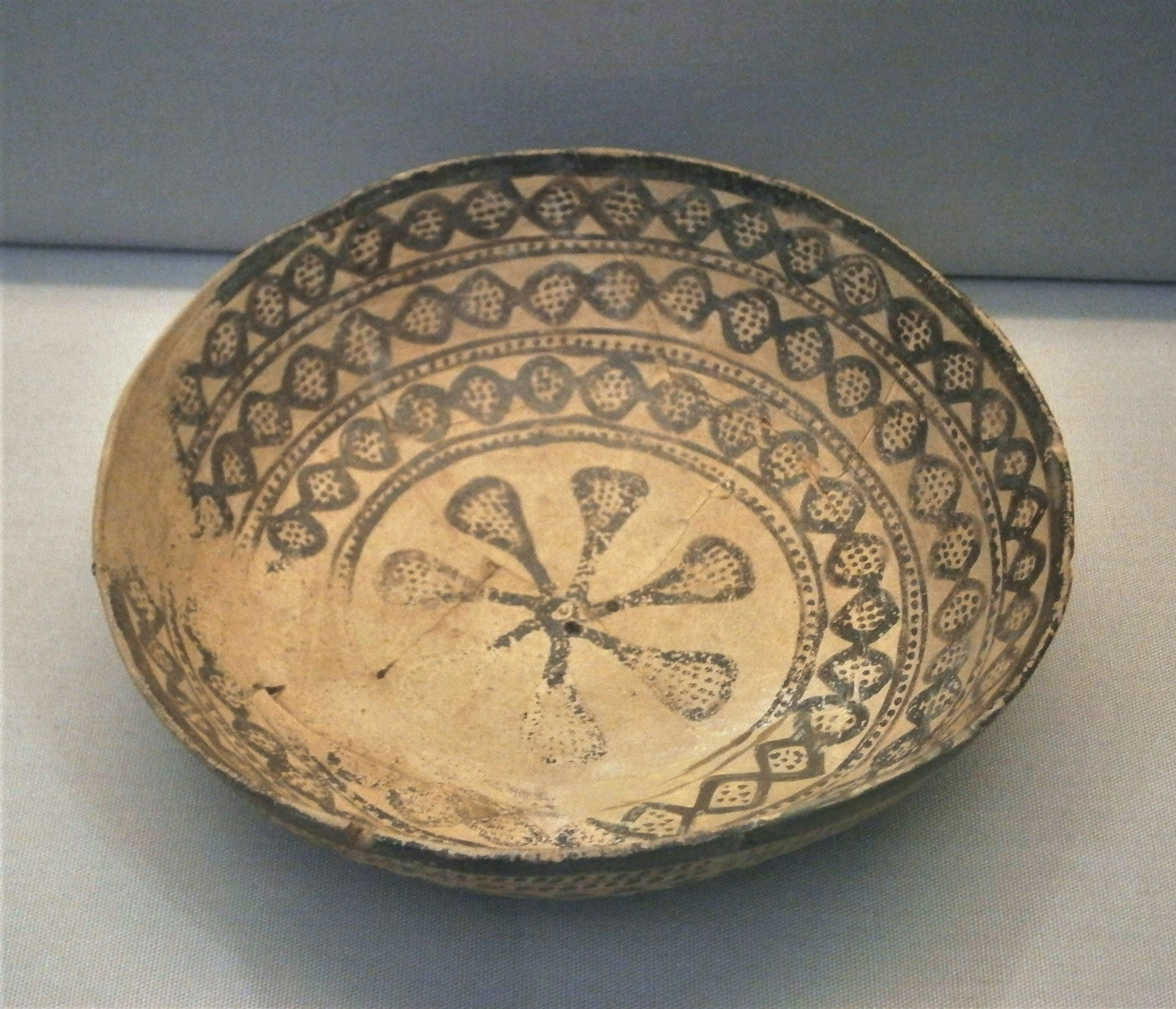
Painted bowl, Late Halaf (c. 5600–5200 BC), Tell Arpachiyah, Iraq. British Museum.

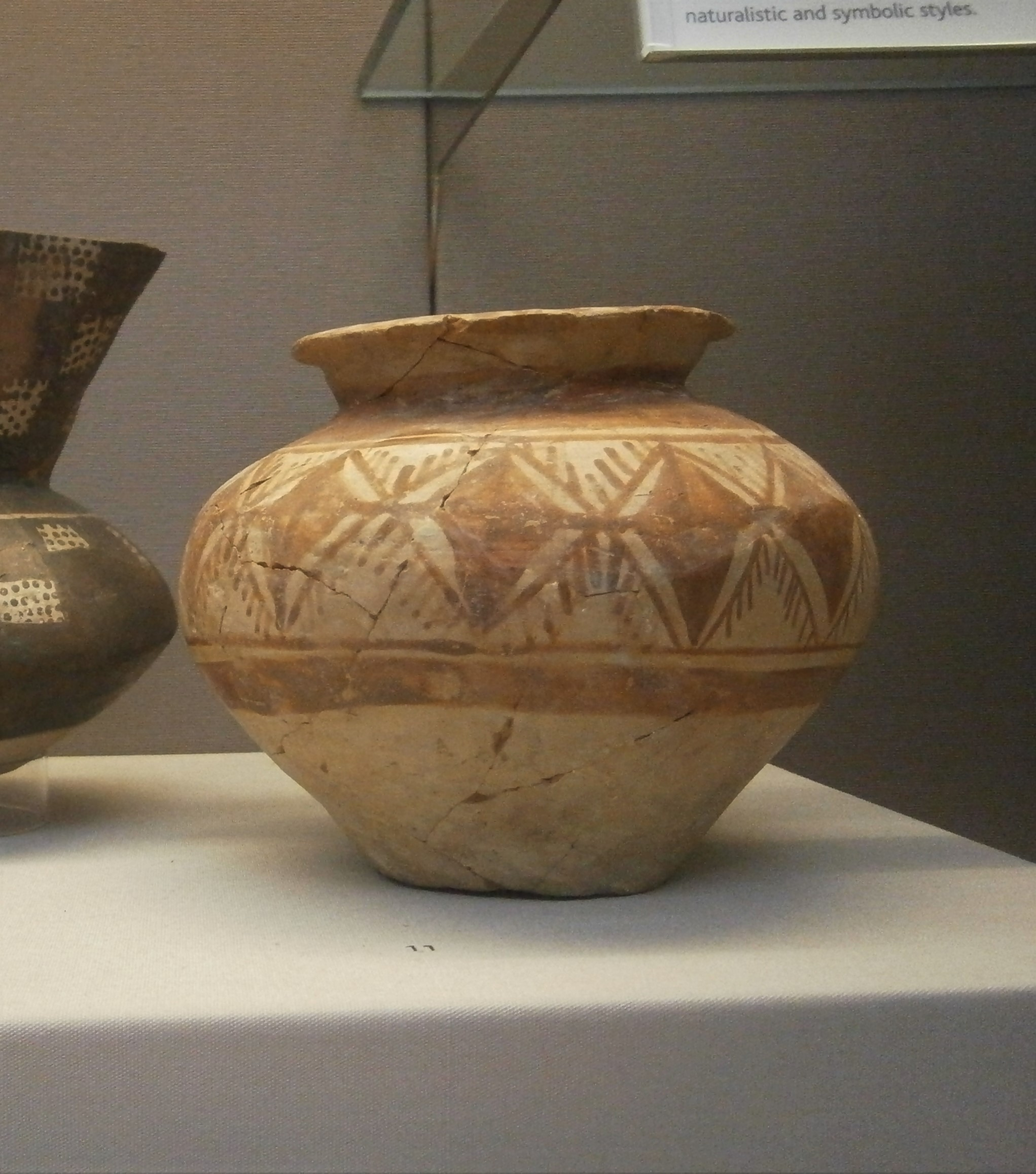
Painted jar, Late Halaf (c. 5600–5200 BC), Chagar Bazar, Syria. British Museum.

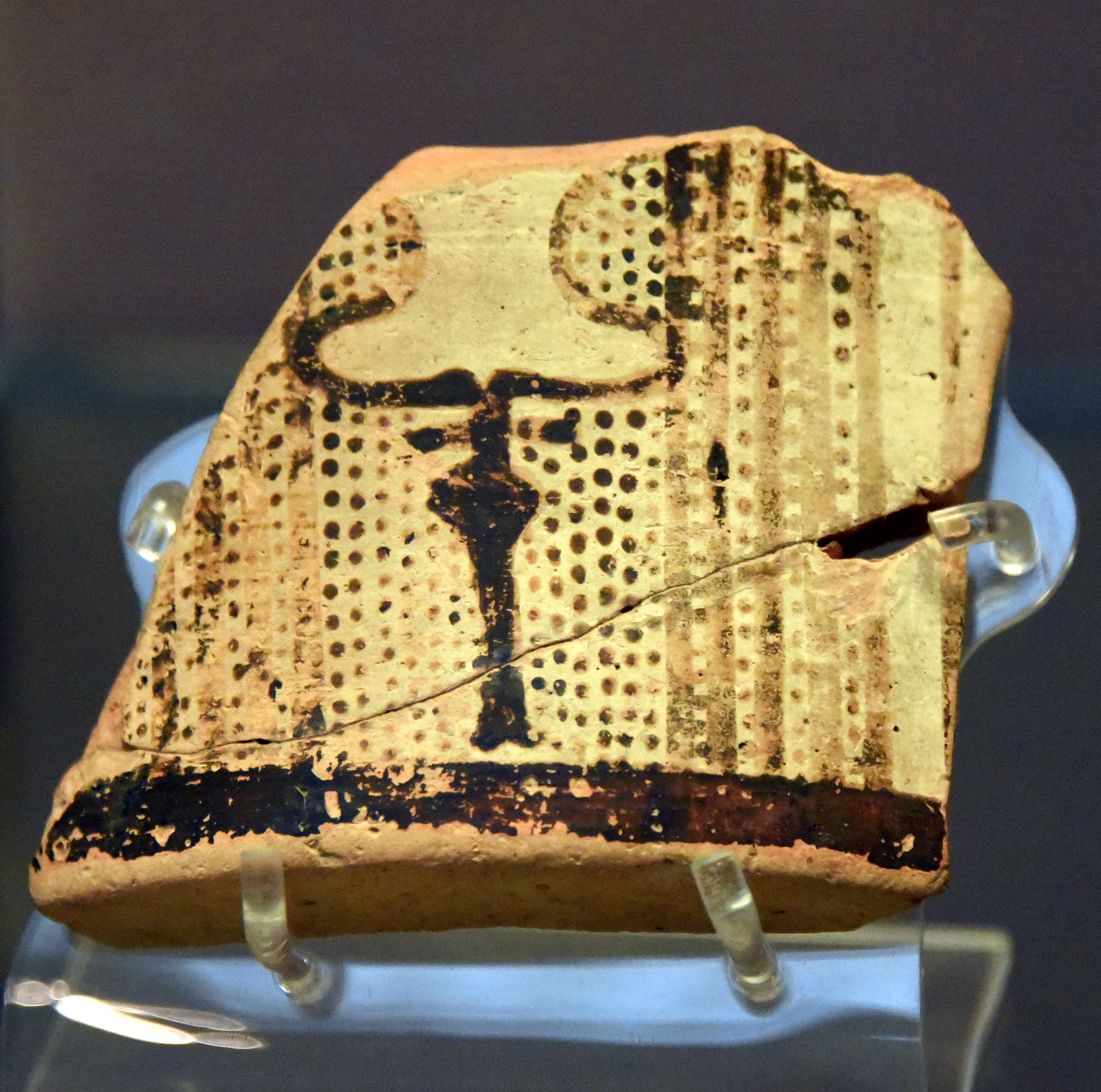
Broken pottery (shard). The exterior is painted with a bucranium. Tell Arpachiyah, Iraq. Halaf period (6000–5000 BC). British Museum.

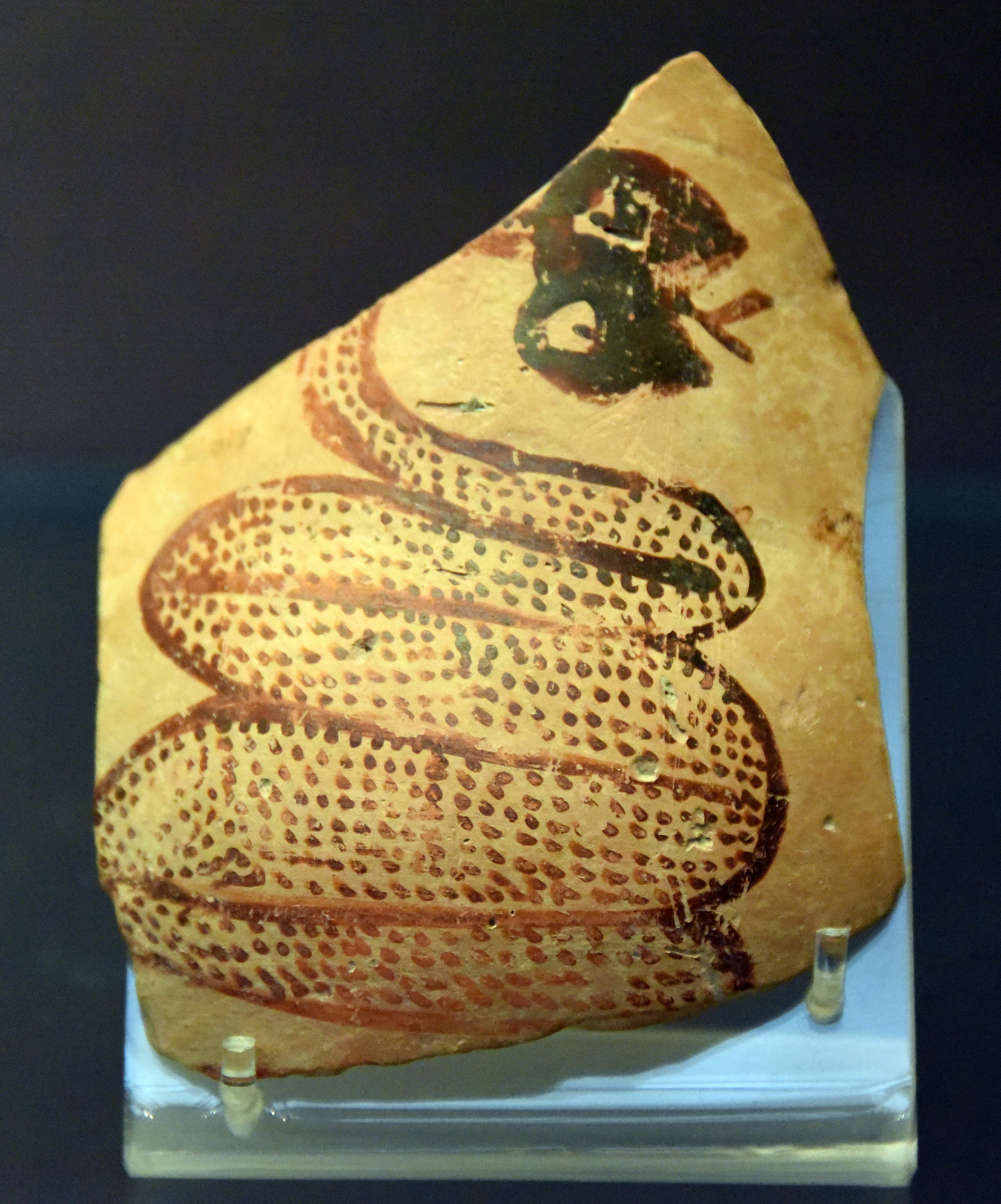
Shard of pottery decorated with a snake sticking out its tongue. Tell Arpachiyah, Iraq. Halaf period (6000–5000 BC). British Museum.

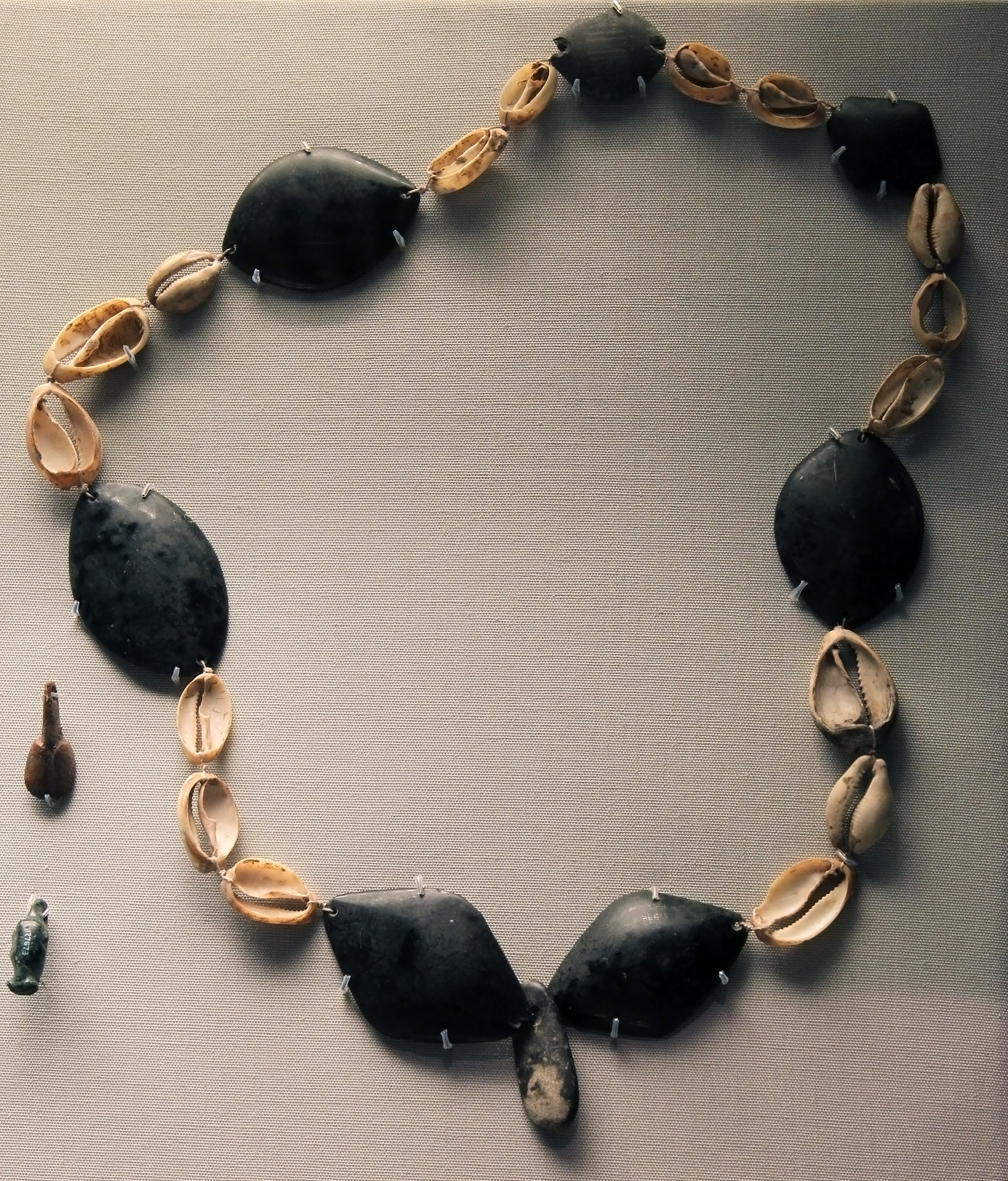
Necklace found at Tell Arpachiyah, made from obsidian beads and cowrie shells from the Persian Gulf, formerly colored with red ochre. British Museum.

Halaf-type pottery seems to have been produced at specialized centers such as Tell Arpachiyah, Tell Brak, Chagar Bazar and Tell Halaf. At Tell Arpachiyah, beneath the upper Ubaid-dated levels, archaeologists have uncovered what appear to be pottery workshops or stores, as numerous pottery-making and cutting tools were present: stone and obsidian objects, a large number of flint and obsidian cores. This level was completely burnt, apparently deliberately, probably for ritual reasons. Tell Arpachiyah may well have been a special religious site: an area of round buildings (wrongly assimilated to the tholos of Mycenae), (Note: In 1929, archaeologist Max von Oppenheim discovered the first shards of pottery from the Halaf culture at Tell Halaf, under the rubble of the palace of an Aramaic kinglet from the 10th century BC. Little was known about Near Eastern prehistory at the time, and Max von Oppenheim believed that the shards discovered belonged to the Greek civilization.) surrounded by a perimeter wall, contains numerous burials, but, unlike the round constructions of other places, contains no trace of habitation.

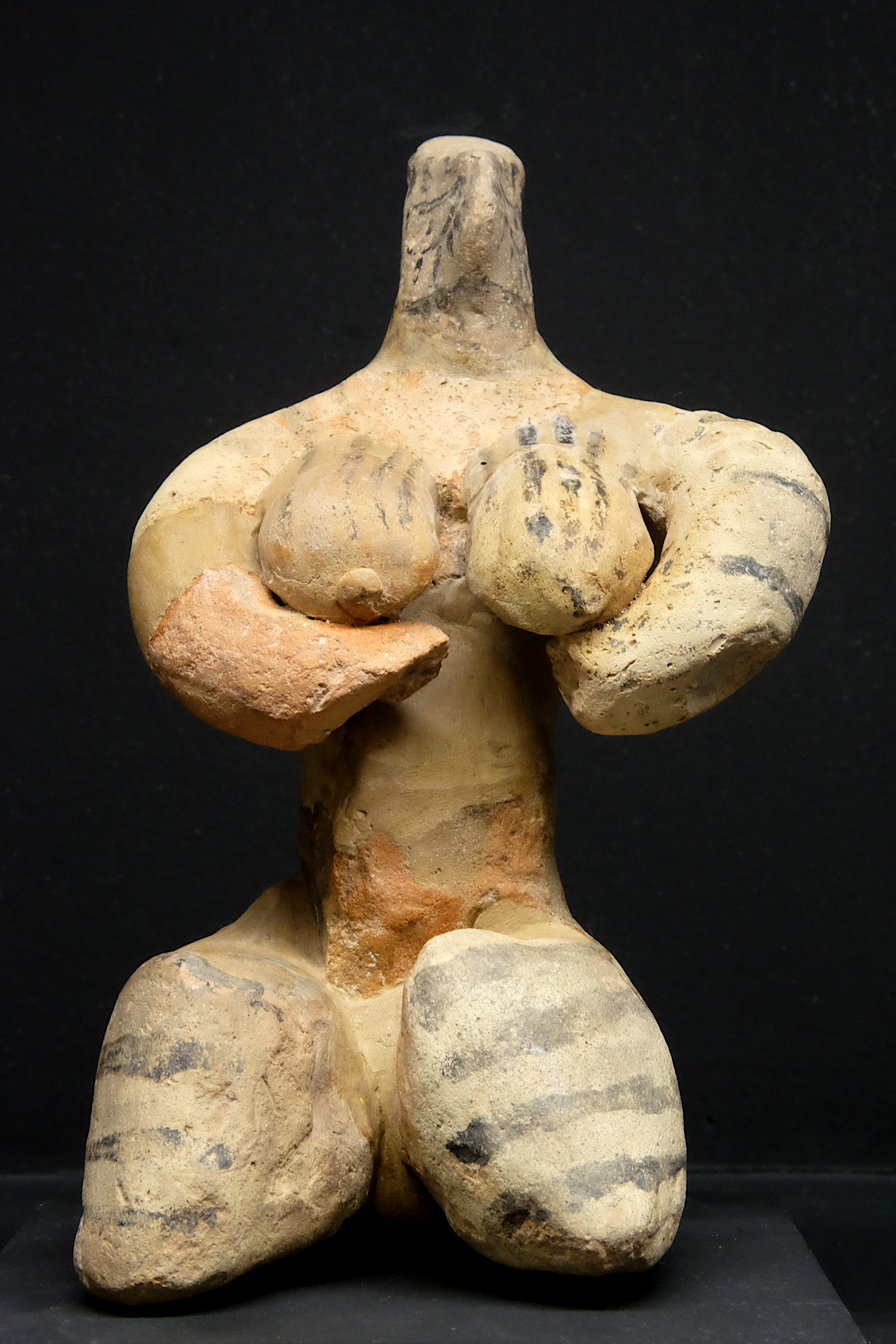
Seated parturient figurine from the Halaf period. The paint bands are painted with henna, and the upper arms show traces of scarification marks. Royal Museums of Art and History, Brussels.

Once the pottery was produced in the center of the village, it was transported via intermediate centers to more distant destinations, notably as far as the Persian Gulf, in exchange for other products. Apart from these production centers, the villages of the Halaf culture have the common characteristic of often being very small. The expansion of this culture seems to have taken place from one village to the next: as soon as a village exceeded a hundred inhabitants, settlers move away to build a new village nearby. For prehistorian Jean-Paul Demoule, this is the hallmark of a low-hierarchical society that develops in small human agglomerations. For Georges Roux, "nothing indicates a brutal invasion, and everything we know about them points to the slow infiltration of a peaceful people". Nevertheless, for researcher Joan Oates, there is ample evidence of deliberate cranial deformation in this culture, a "practice with considerable elitist potential" already mentioned in the section devoted to the Samarra period. At Tell Arpachiyah, the dentition found on the deformed skulls indicates that their bearers were genetically related, suggesting the constitution of an elite family group.

Another notable aspect of the Halaf culture is the female figures of childbirth that are typical of this culture. They depict a seated woman supporting her breasts with her arms. The body is decorated with lines and strokes that appear to represent tattoos, jewelry, or clothing. The head is often represented by a flattened neck stump, sometimes with two large eyes. These may be talismans against sterility.

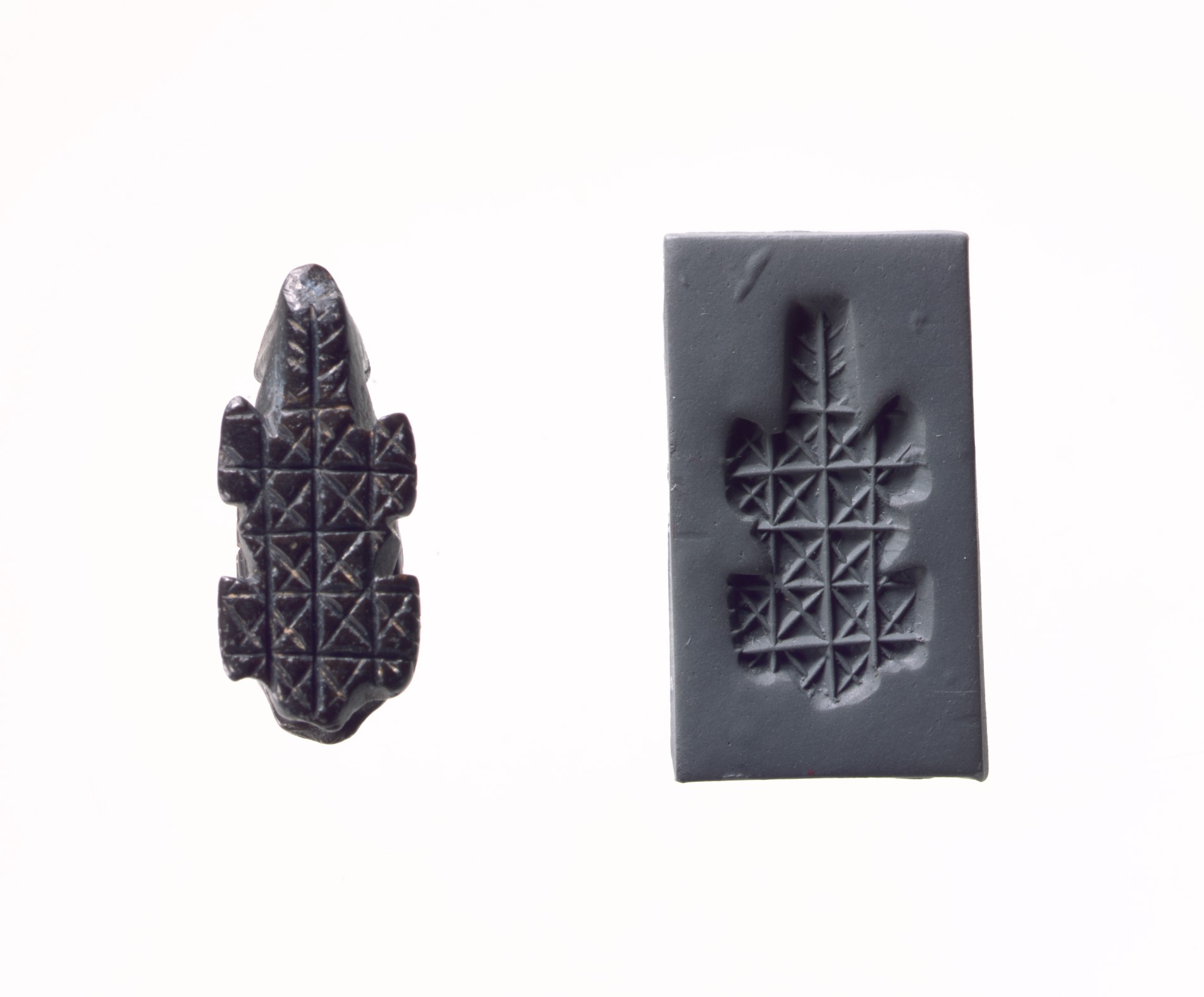
Seal and its modern impression with geometric motif from the Halaf period. Provenance: North Syria (circa 5600 BC – 5000 BC). Metropolitan Museum of Art.

The Halaf culture is characterized by circular structures called "tholoi" by archaeologists, most of which were actually dwellings (unlike the Mycenaean tholoi). Built of mud or brick on pebble foundations, they sometimes had a quadrangular extension and were covered by a dome. The seeds of domesticated and dry-farmed plants collected in the villages indicate that the inhabitants of the round houses of the Halaf culture, like their contemporaries in Samarra and Hassuna, were largely sedentary farmers and breeders. This does not exclude the existence of itinerant herders who moved between base villages and seasonal transhumance camps. The bones found are those of common animals such as sheep, pigs, goats and oxen.

It is worth noting the marginal existence of a form of hunting that has evolved from a collective practice, characteristic of the PPNB, to a more individual hunt practiced by a smaller group of people. This type of hunting, based on the bones of wild animals (gazelles, onagers, deer, fallow deer, and roe deer), seems to be more important in communities located in the south, where the steppes are more arid. The product of this hunt may have been exchanged for plant products cultivated further north. Primarily for food, it is also used to protect herds, fields, and livestock. However, Halafian arrows, probably coated with poison, are rare and made from local flint, often of poor quality, and more rarely from obsidian. Most of the arrows found are still unused. Consequently, other perishable weapons such as slings or traps may have been used.

At Tell Sabi Abyad, archaeologists have uncovered some 300 clay seal impressions whose original seals cannot be traced. These impressions seal portable containers, baskets, or vases. Far more numerous than those already discovered for the Samarra period, these impressions depict caprids, plants, and geometric motifs. As in Samarra, it is difficult to derive any meaning from them other than that they may be part of an administrative practice of the "contract" type or reflect a desire to control the circulation of goods or commodities. Other Late Halaf Period seal impressions have also been discovered at Tell Arpachiyah.

=== Development and dissemination of Ubaid culture ===
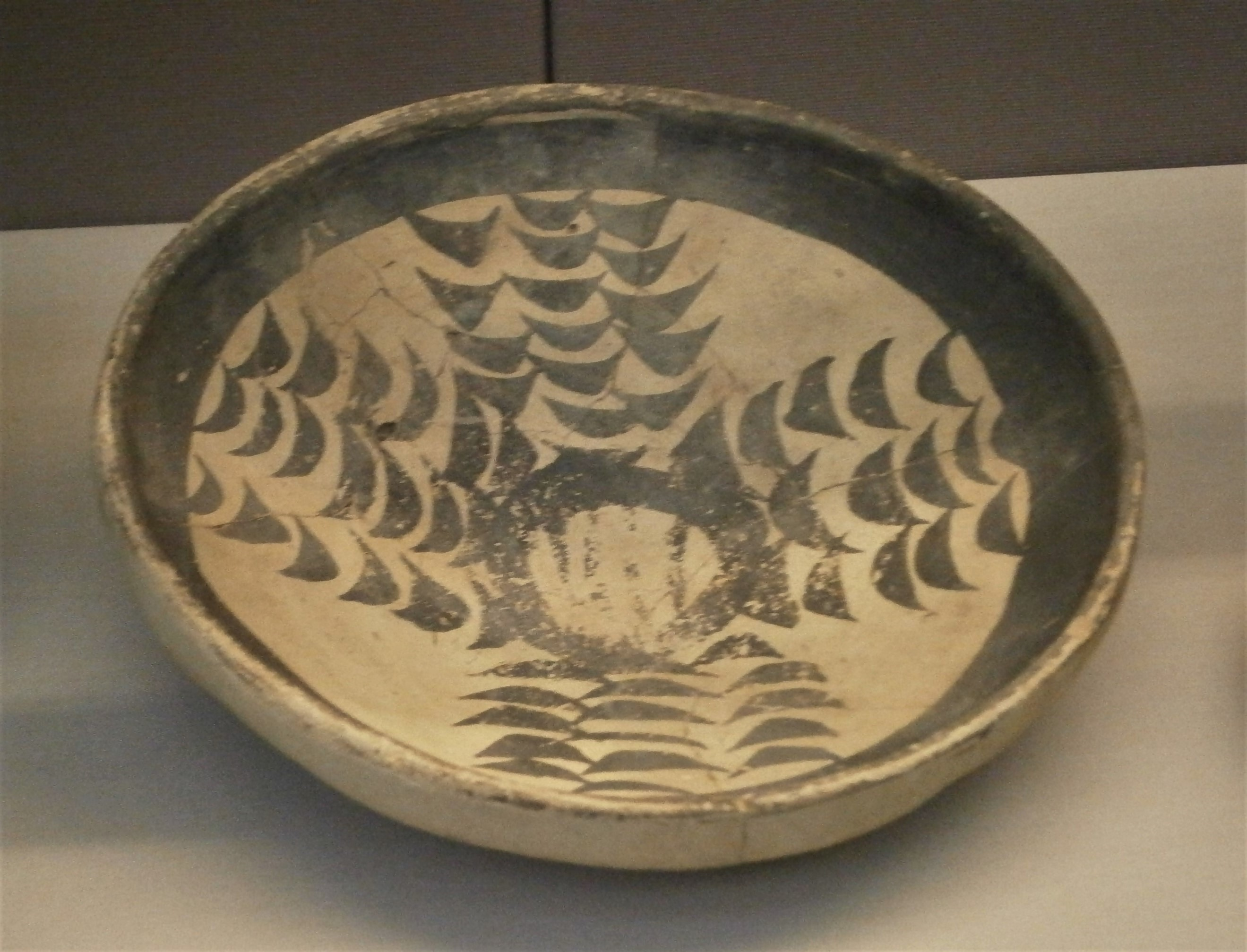
Bowl painted with dark geometric motifs, Ur. British Museum.

The long Ubaid period (c. 6500 BC – 3900 BC) refers to a late Neolithic and an early Chalcolithic phase of prehistory and is named after the site of Tell al-'Ubaid, not far from Ur. There, in 1924, Leonard Woolley, while directing the excavation of a Sumerian temple, discovered numerous monochrome pottery pieces that testified to another culture. Frustrated and less meticulous than the ceramics of the Halaf culture, this pottery, often hastily decorated with geometric motifs and sometimes inspired by nature, was also discovered in a nearby ancient cemetery.

Later, the remains of the city of Eridu provided the first important information about the architecture of the Ubaid culture. Subsequently, the discovery in the 1980s of the Tell el-'Oueili site, north of the modern city of Nassiriyah, revealed the much older nature of the Ubaid culture and pushed back its origins to around 6500 BC, thus attributing Tell el-Ubaid to a very late phase of its eponymous culture. The term "Ubaid culture" is therefore a rather conventional appellation that does not reflect any real continuity or uniformity of this culture.

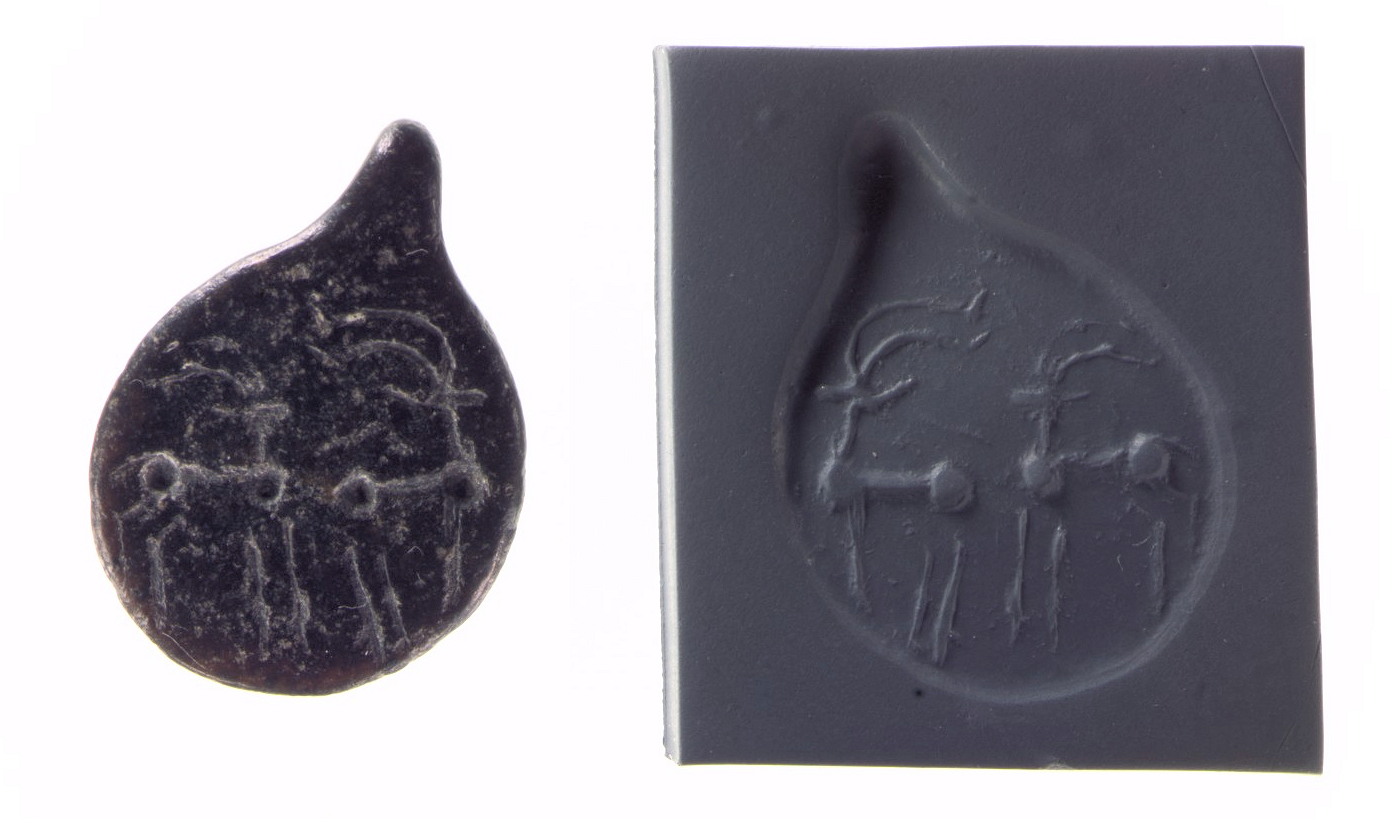
Drop-shaped pendant seal with two quadrupeds and its modern impression. 4500–3500. Late Ubaid - Middle Gawra period (northern Mesopotamia) Metropolitan Museum of Art - New York

Researchers have identified six successive phases, numbered from 0 to 5, and named after representative sites, based on visible changes in the forms and decoration of ceramics related to this culture. Early Ubaid is mainly documented by the sites of Tell el-Oueili (Ubaid 0 and 1), Eridu and Haggi Muhammad (Ubaid 1 and 2), which are the oldest known sites in Lower Mesopotamia (c. 6500 BC – 5300 BC). The last phases 3, 4, and 5 are documented by Tell el-Ubaid itself, but are above all marked by the spread of the Ubaid culture to northern Iraq and northeastern Syria in the middle of the 6th millennium BC, with Tepe Gawra, northeast of Nineveh, and Zeidan, near the confluence of the Khabour and Euphrates rivers, as significant sites. The Ubaid culture also appears to have spread southwards: sites related to the Ubaid culture are also found in Kuwait, with evidence of boat use suggesting the development of fishing and perhaps even the presence of pearl-seeking divers. Seasonal sites are also attested along the northeast coast of Saudi Arabia and in Qatar. Shards linked to the Ubaid culture have also been found in the southern Emirates.

Until the end of the 5th millennium BC, the egalitarian, non-stratified character of Ubaid culture communities is generally accepted: as in Late Neolithic communities, temporary and cyclical leadership - based on a communal corporate identity - seems to have been in the hands of the Elders. The scarcity of marks of status and differentiation in the remains, and the virtual absence of luxury, exotic, or prestige objects, in villages that were generally small in size and with very few differences in individual architecture, are indicators of a type of organization with little hierarchical structure. Added to this, even on sites that were probably of regional importance, is the scarcity of seals linked to administrative control and an apparent lack of specialization in trades. It was not until the last centuries of Tell Abada's occupation (end of 5th millennium BC) that archaeologists observed specialized activity in the manufacture of ceramics and the intensive use of marker tokens, a sign of more elaborate administrative management.

==== Southern Ubaid culture ====
Described as "islands surrounded in a marshy plain", still evoked in the impressions of cylindrical seals from the late 4th millennium BC, the sites discovered so far in southern Mesopotamia are located on so-called "turtle shell" terraces, the remains of stepped alluvial terraces incised during the Pleistocene that evoke the patterns of a tortoise shell when seen from the air. These sites, like Hadji Muhammed and Ras al-Amiya, were discovered accidentally during modern construction work, as they lie deep beneath thick layers of alluvium carried by the streams of the ancient Mesopotamian delta. It is therefore likely that many other sites remain unexplored under a thick layer of sediment.

The oldest excavated levels of the Ubaid culture are found at Tell el-Oueili. Dated to 6200 BC using carbon-14 measurements, they lie just above a water table. The water table prevents archaeologists from reaching the virgin soil, leaving one or more archaeological layers currently unexplored, and it doesn't appear that occupation of the site began until 6200 BC, such is the high level of neolithization of the population on the levels that can be explored. They were already cultivating cereals such as wheat and barley, while beef, pork, sheep, and goats were domesticated. In addition, the Oueili levels of Ubaid 0 have yielded pottery closely related to that of Choga Mami - attesting to contacts with the Samarra culture - female figurines and tripartite buildings similar to the Proto-Hassuna of Tell el-Sawwan.

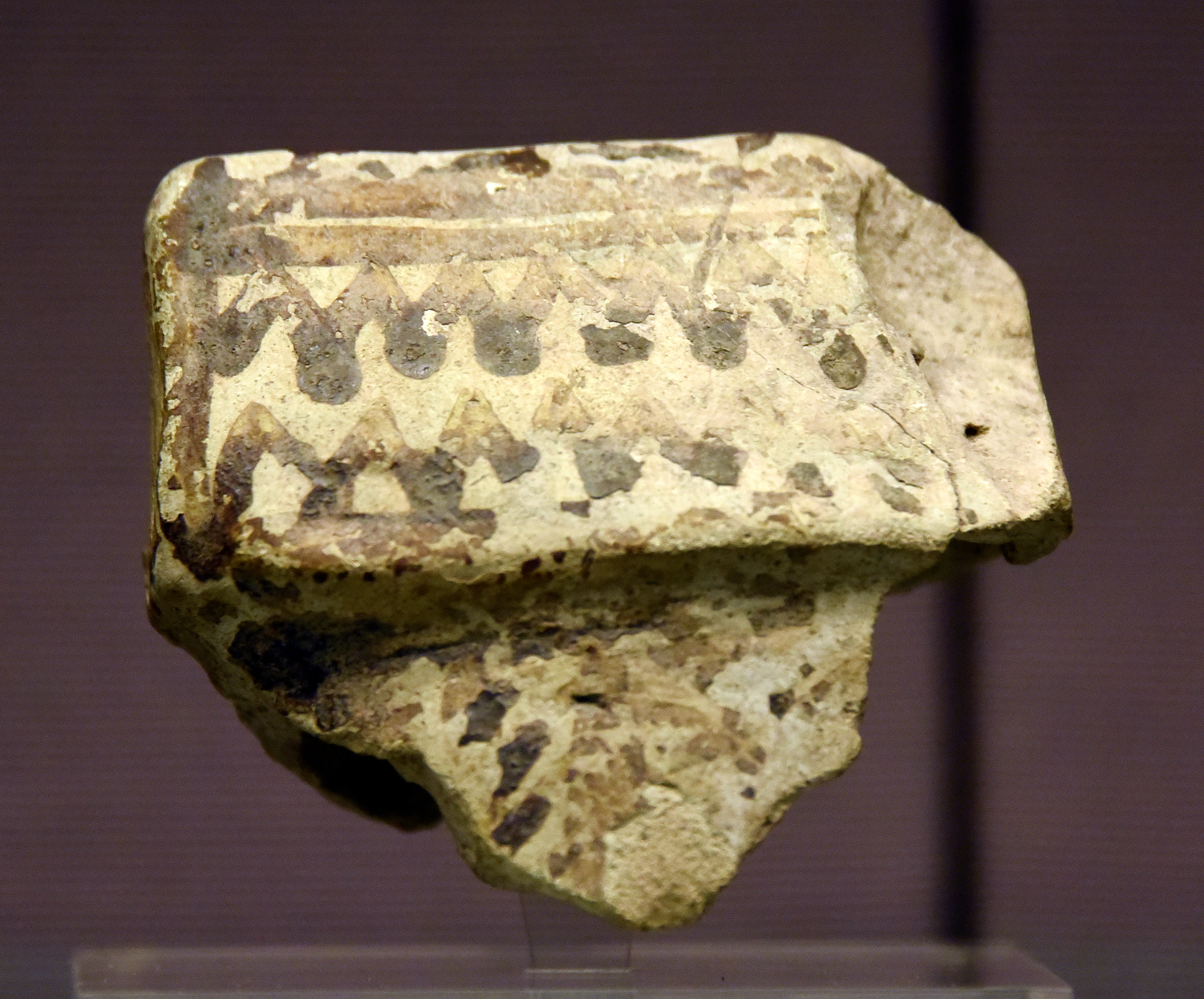
Terracotta model of a house with only the reed thatch roof represented by the paint strokes. Tell el-Ubaid 5900–4000 BC British Museum - London.

However, the buildings are much larger than those at Tell es-Sawwan: wooden posts support the roof, while stairs lead to terraces and a large living room with a fireplace, a possible place for family gatherings that seem to have brought two generations together. Adjacent to this room are a series of small rooms, each with a hollowed-out fireplace, probably providing private spaces for a nuclear family. In addition, another large outdoor structure with huge cellars appears to be a large communal attic. All of these structures are pre-designed using life-size plans drawn on the ground. These plans are based on a unit of measurement of about 5′ 9" (1.75 m) - that's six feet by 0′ 11" (0.29 m). In addition, familiarity with certain geometric properties of triangles made it possible to draw right angles. The walls are made of mud bricks pressed between two planks. The tops of these bricks are convex, with fingerprints that help them adhere to the mortar. It wasn't until the middle of the 6th millennium BC (Ubaid 1) that bricks of uniform size were formed into a frame. They were also used in the construction of more numerous but narrower granaries.

Generally speaking, despite the apparently wetter climate of the time, irrigated agriculture seems to have gradually developed, while leaving some room for the exploitation of marshes (fish, reeds), another major factor in the development of human communities in southern Mesopotamia. Date palms, wheat, and barley were also cultivated. Cattle and pigs were raised alongside smaller numbers of sheep and goats.

During the Ubaid 2 and 3 periods, certain buildings were enlarged to such an extent that the archaeological community was divided over their use. For others, the religion of the time still seems to have been practiced in small sanctuaries, and the large buildings discovered under the Eridu ziggurat seem more likely to have been used for meetings, or to welcome visitors in the manner of the present-day mudhif of the Marsh Arabs of southern Iraq. Pascal Butterlin hypothesizes that community buildings rubbed shoulders with those reserved for worship, both built in the tripartite model and expanded over the centuries. Later, during the Uruk period, the size of the buildings at Uruk seemed to increase more rapidly than those north of Mesopotamia at Tepe Gawra or Tell Brak.

==== Northward expansion ====
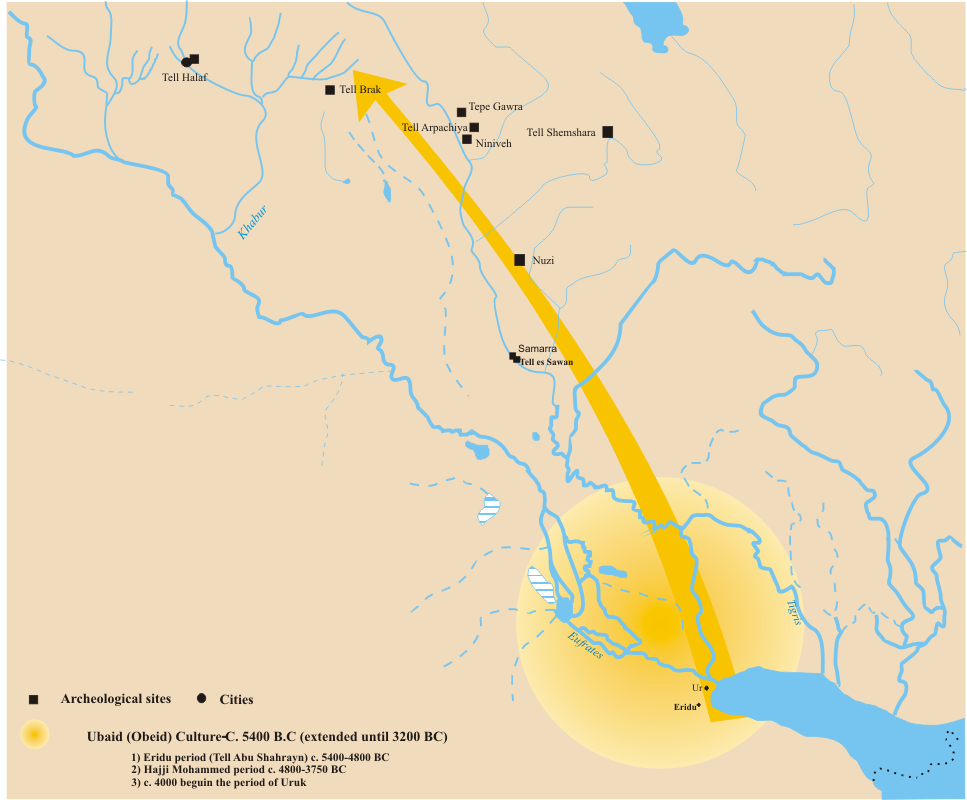
Northward expansion of Ubaid culture

The third Ubaid phase (c. 5200 BC – 4500 BC) was marked by expansion into northern Iraq and northeastern Syria: pottery and utilitarian objects such as clay grinders and figurines identical to the sites discovered in the south are found at more northerly sites like Tell Arpachiyah and Tepe Gawra near Mosul, Tell Zeidan on the Middle Euphrates and as far as Değirmentepe in eastern Anatolia, where the first traces of copper metallurgy appear. While it is well established that the spread of the Ubaid culture took place over several centuries by a slow, gradual, and peaceful change, its mechanism still remains the subject of debate. For Joan Oates, this propagation is the product of cultural movements through marriages or exchange systems. For Jean-Daniel Forest, the Halaf culture, as it advanced into southern Mesopotamia, was forced to adopt irrigated agriculture, imitating the already existing Ubaid culture to such an extent that the latter rapidly replaced the Halaf culture to the north. However, it was a new way for the people to express their identity through new objects in their daily lives, especially a style of pottery very similar to that of the south, but with different, more naturalistic decorative motifs and with a more reddish color than that of the Halaf pottery and that of the southern Ubaid culture.

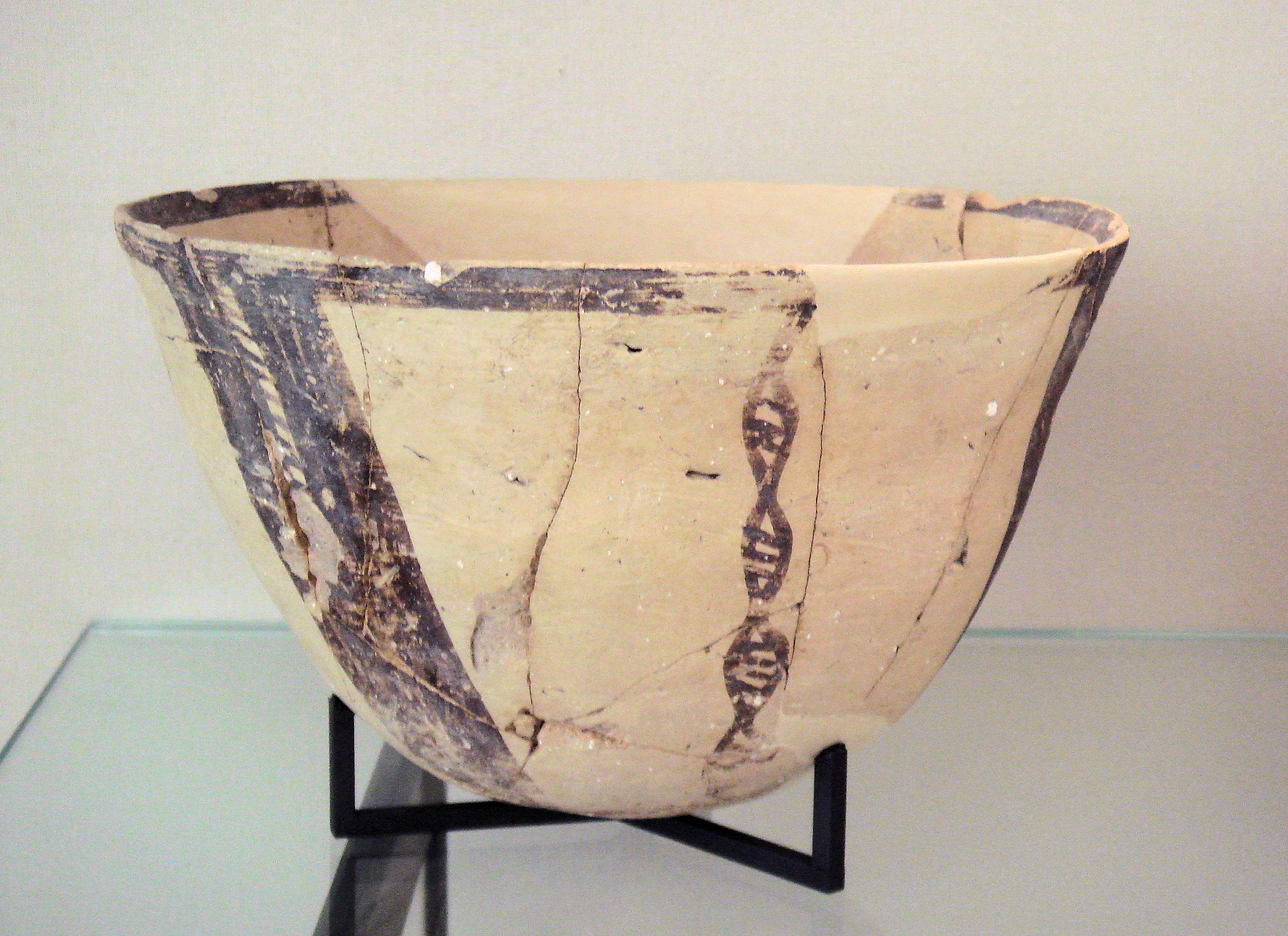
Ubaid pottery 5100 B.C. – 4500 B.C., Tepe Gawra. Musée du Louvre, Paris.

By the middle of the 6th millennium BC, the circular, tholoi-type houses of the Halaf culture were gradually replaced by the rectangular, multi-room houses typical of the northern Ubaid period. Most of these followed a tripartite plan, with the smaller rooms often arranged symmetrically around a large central hall. This type of building is found at Tell Abada in the Hamrin Basin, where it is characterized by regular buttresses, at Tepe Gawra in northern Iraq, and as far away as Değirmentepe in Anatolia. Tell Abada also has a hydraulic pipe system that brings water from a nearby spring and wadi to a cistern inside the village. The village also seems to have specialized in the manufacture of pottery: the oldest evidence of the use of the potter's wheel can be found here, dating back to the 6th millennium BC.

The culture's treatment of the dead seems to have gradually become more uniform. Whereas the Halaf culture showed great diversity, the Ubaid culture was content with burials in simple tombs equipped with a few ceramic vessels, with no apparent social differentiation. While Tell Arpachiyah has a small Ubaid cemetery outside the domestic dwellings, similar to the larger contemporary cemetery at Eridu in southern Mesopotamia, burial within the village seem to have been limited to the burial of infants under the houses. The same is true of Abada, where fifty-seven infant urns were found in the basements of large buildings.

== The emergence of towns ==
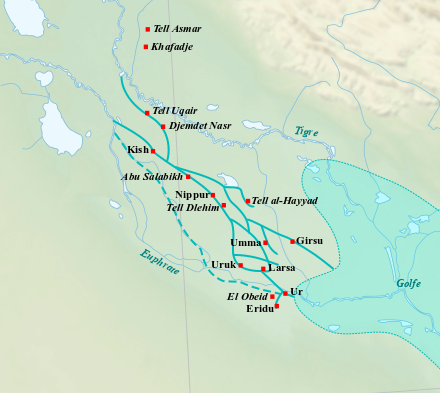
Major sites in southern Mesopotamia during the Uruk period

Late Chalcolithic Mesopotamia - which includes the end of the Final Ubaid period (c. 4000–3900 BC) and the Uruk period (3900–3200 BC) - witnessed a society that gradually became hierarchical around influential families occupying large houses in which no agricultural tools were found. These were adjacent to what are now recognized as temples built in towns that grew considerably in size, dominating neighboring villages to the point of taking on an urban or "proto-urban" character. What's more, these temples seem to have housed a sacred class that would legitimize the new secular "officials" with whom they were closely associated.

The discovery at Uruk of a series of tablets written in symbolic signs - the first of their kind - reflects the activity of a complex, stratified administration. Among these texts is the List of Titles and Professions. It probably dates from after the 4th millennium BC, but its compilation seems to illustrate an earlier situation indicating a four-level hierarchical society, with various professions, as well as economic and political groups, becoming increasingly complex.

All these elements go hand in hand with the emergence of cities that seem to evolve from two geographic poles: those in northern Mesopotamia, such as Tell Brak or Tepe Gawra, and those in the south, such as Uruk. At the beginning of the 4th millennium BC, the cities of these two poles developed independently.

However, from the middle of the 4th millennium BC, the development of the northern cities tended to slow down: they stopped growing and even began to shrink. At this time, relations between the two regions of north and south seemed to become unbalanced, leading to a kind of "colonization" of northern cities by southern ones. This colonization, more often than not economically motivated, took place along the trade routes of northern Iraq, northern Syria and southeastern Turkey, and can be recognized by the dominance of pottery with forms characteristic of the southern Mesopotamian city of Uruk, and by certain types of construction, seal design, and sealing practices.

Habuba Kabira is a case in point: the Syrian site in the Middle Euphrates region shows such close links with southern Mesopotamia that this city and its religious center near Jebel Aruda are considered a "colony" of Uruk. Tripartite houses with outdoor spaces and sometimes large reception halls were built along streets organized around the gates of a massive wall. They were surrounded by a dense assembly of smaller houses. This latter urban layout may have been similar to that of Uruk, whose site has only been partially excavated. At Haçinebi Tepe, on the Turkish Euphrates near the modern city of Birecik, local pottery has been found alongside pottery from southern Mesopotamia.

Towards the end of the 4th millennium BC, colonization of Uruk seems to have come to a halt: the use of southern-style pottery diminished and disappeared. But this is not always followed by a simple and immediate rebound of northern political structures: the lower town of Tell Brak, for example, was abandoned and the site declined significantly. By contrast, in Arslantepe, where Uruk's colonization seems to have been less overwhelming, a new type of elite emerges, apparently based more on personal power than on temple institutions.

=== Resource exchange and control ===
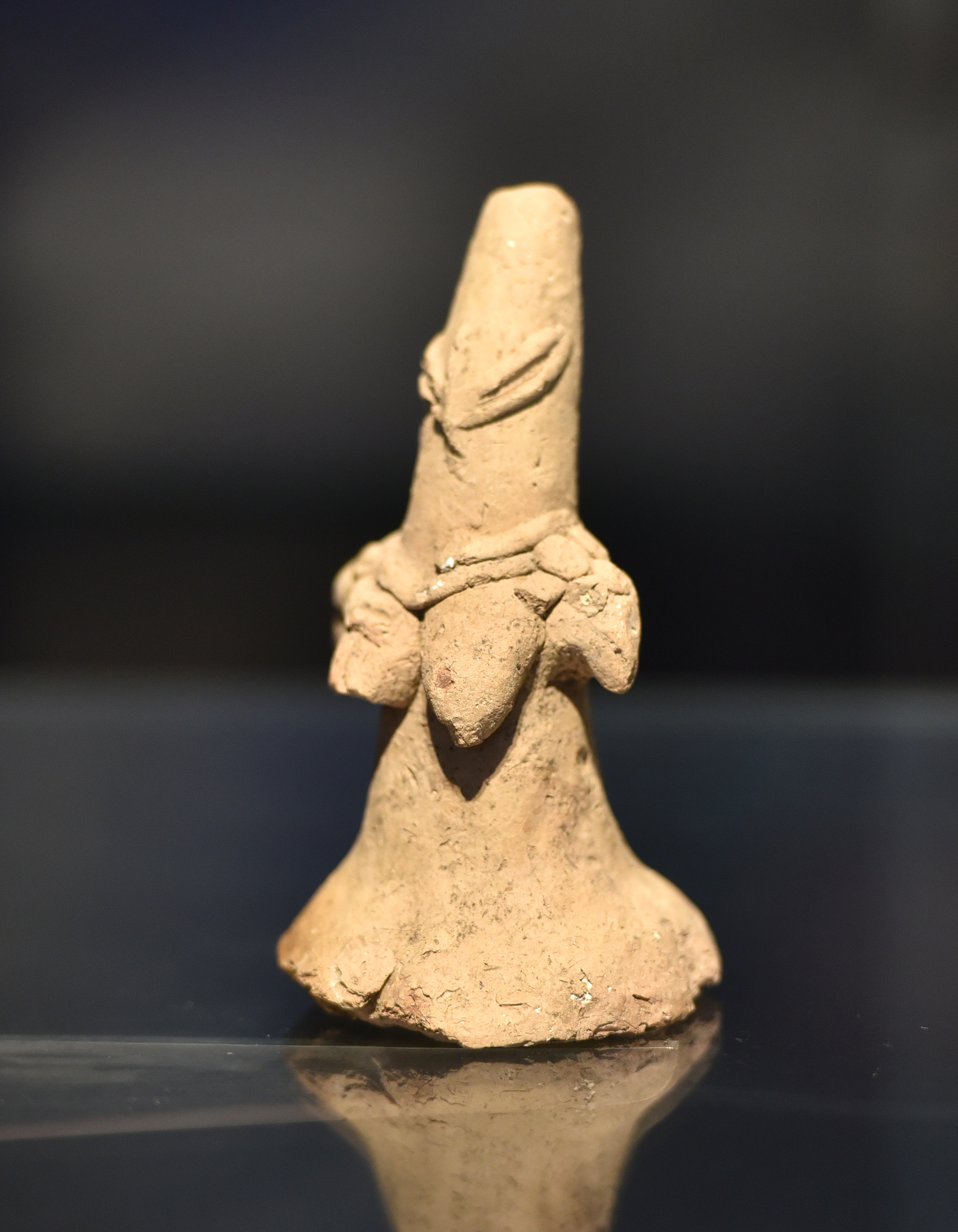
Primitive terracotta representation of a woman. Ur or Eridu, Iraq (4000–3500 BC). National Museum of Iraq - Baghdad.

While it has now been shown that irrigated agriculture in the south - especially with the help of the spider's ards and wagons - was not the sole cause of the centralization of social organization, it did produce a food surplus that was used to maintain specialists, leaders, priests, and artisans who did not produce their own food. This food surplus - along with pearls and fish - was also traded between the southern elite and those in the north, where dry agriculture was less intensive, but where copper ore, precious stones, obsidian (southeastern Turkey), and wood were available, woolly sheep were raised for cloth, and the potter's wheel (already known by the middle of the 6th millennium BC) was introduced.

Similarly, the increased use of seals and tokens reflects the existence of increasingly centralized and controlled economic activities. Moreover, these seals became increasingly complex. They are used to seal a wide variety of portable goods shipped in sacks, baskets, and jars, marking the authority under which the contents are placed. They are also placed around doors to control access to storage areas. In addition, broken seals appear to have been kept as a record of transactions. While clay seals were initially associated with one or more dwelling units, by 4000 BC they began to be concentrated around newly emerging religious institutions.

=== Burial diversification ===
Although the lack of distinctive signs on the remains of a Late Ubaid cemetery at Eridu is indicative of societies that were not very hierarchical until the middle of the 5th millennium BC, researcher Joan Oates points out that the social status of the people buried in the Eridu cemetery is still unknown and that this cemetery alone does not indicate the absence of social inequalities. At Tepe Gawra, in northeastern Iraq near Mosul, the evolution of burial practices, which had previously been on the way to standardization, became more diversified: the 6th millennium BC cemetery saw the appearance of very rich tombs containing gold, silver, and other rare materials never before seen, sometimes associated with infant burials.

Tell Majnuna, a subsidiary mound of the Tell Brak site, provides evidence of a mass burial of partially articulated individuals. These human remains probably represent a feast or massacre, suggesting a violent assertion of power. This is in contrast to the burials of the Ubaid period and undoubtedly implies a loss of individual identity.

=== Crafts and art ===
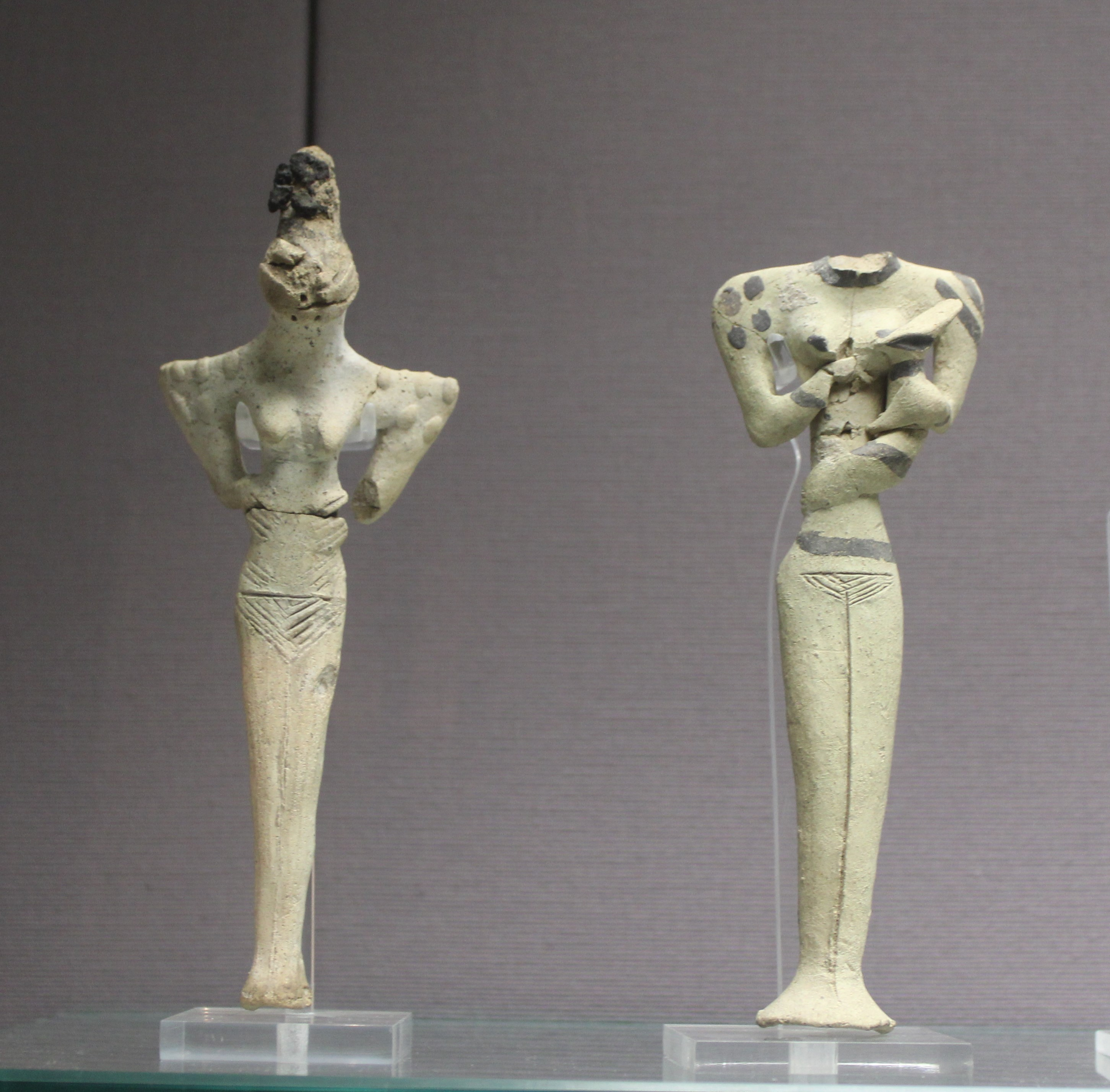
Female terracotta figurines, one with pointed skull, Ur. British Museum.

The painted pottery of earlier cultures tends to disappear in favor of simpler materials, sometimes mass-produced and identical - so-called Coba bowls with the "ox" symbol inlaid on some of them, also found at Tell Zeidan and, later, at Uruk - whose use is not yet attested, but which could be measures of rations, indicative of a more complex management of resources. During the Middle and Late Uruk periods, beveled-edged bowls found in very large quantities could also have been used to distribute standardized rations or to make bread.

So-called "lizard-head" figures, probably representing the ruling elite, are very common in Eridu and Ur. They provide further evidence for the practice of skull deformation, an indicator (discussed above) for the existence of a non-working class. One of the male figures found at Eridu holds a club, which could be interpreted as a symbol of authority.

At Tell Brak, numerous seal impressions have been found dating from 4200 to 3600 BC. They often depict animals such as lions alone or in groups, snakes, or goats. These animals are often fighting each other, and the only humans depicted are fighting a lion or snake with weapons or tools. The lion could be seen as a symbol of authority at a time when leadership was becoming more powerful. This was before they appeared in art from southern Mesopotamia at the end of the Uruk period. There are also hybrid figures that combine humans and animals (except for goat heads), or combine goat heads with the legs or wings of other animals. Geometric or abstract motifs, flowers and a few complex scenes complete the Tell Brak collection.

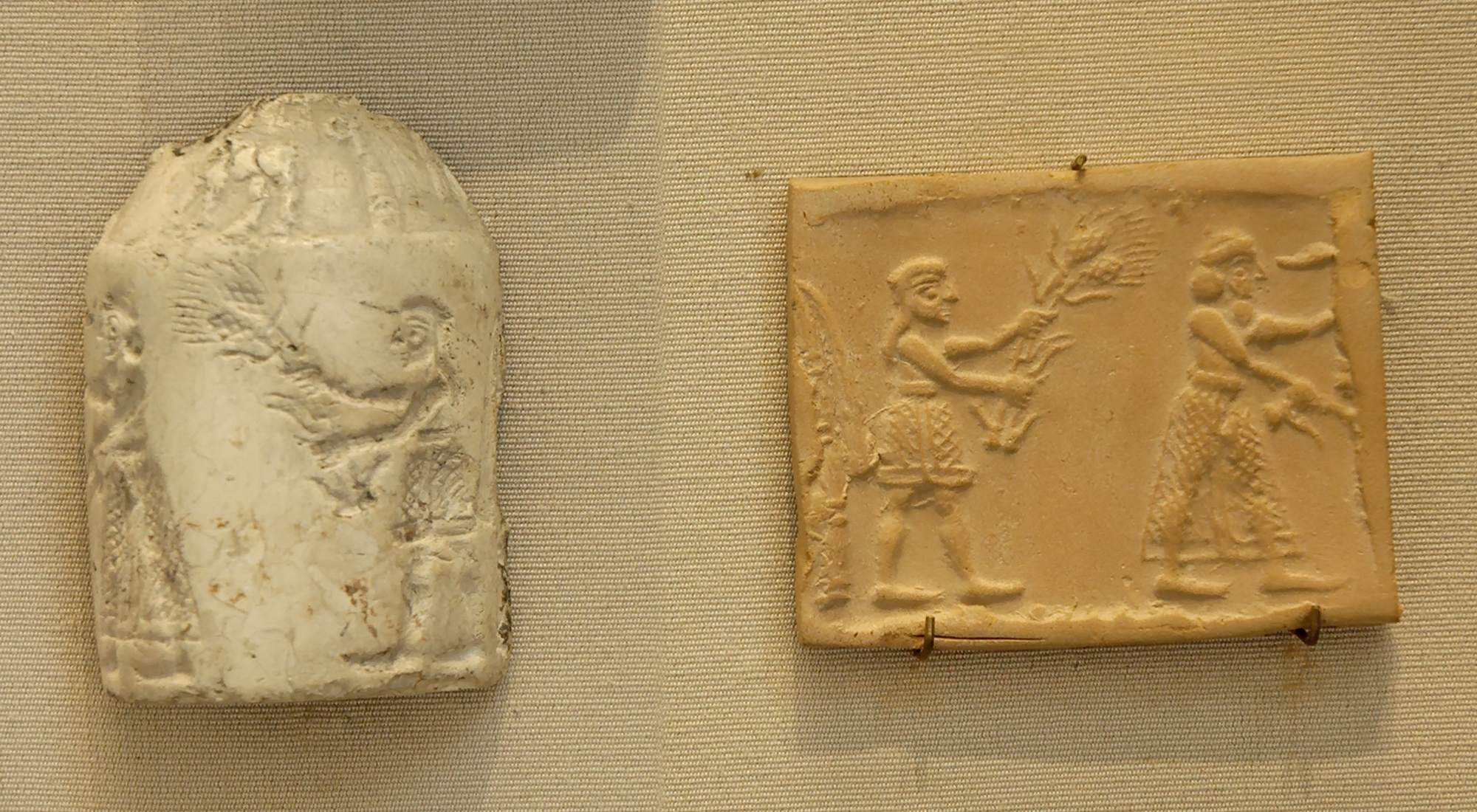
Limestone cylinder seal and impression: the king (the man in the net skirt) and an acolyte feeding the sacred flock, Uruk period, circa 3200 B.C. British Museum

There are, however, a considerable number of seals depicting vultures. An elegant symbol, especially integrated in everyday life: the hypothesis that it could be related to the processing of waste resulting from extensive urbanization seems plausible. The carrion and garbage eaten and processed by the vultures could have led the inhabitants of the time to consider these birds of prey as a blessing.

The 4th millennium BC also saw the appearance of the first cylinder seals. The earliest were discovered in the Middle Uruk levels and predate the Eanna buildings. Their complexity provides greater security than the seals used previously. An important figure, the "man in the net skirt" (or "priest-king") is often depicted, sometimes hunting lions, attributes or prerogatives known later in Mesopotamian history as those of kings, priests, and warriors.

=== Towns and temples ===
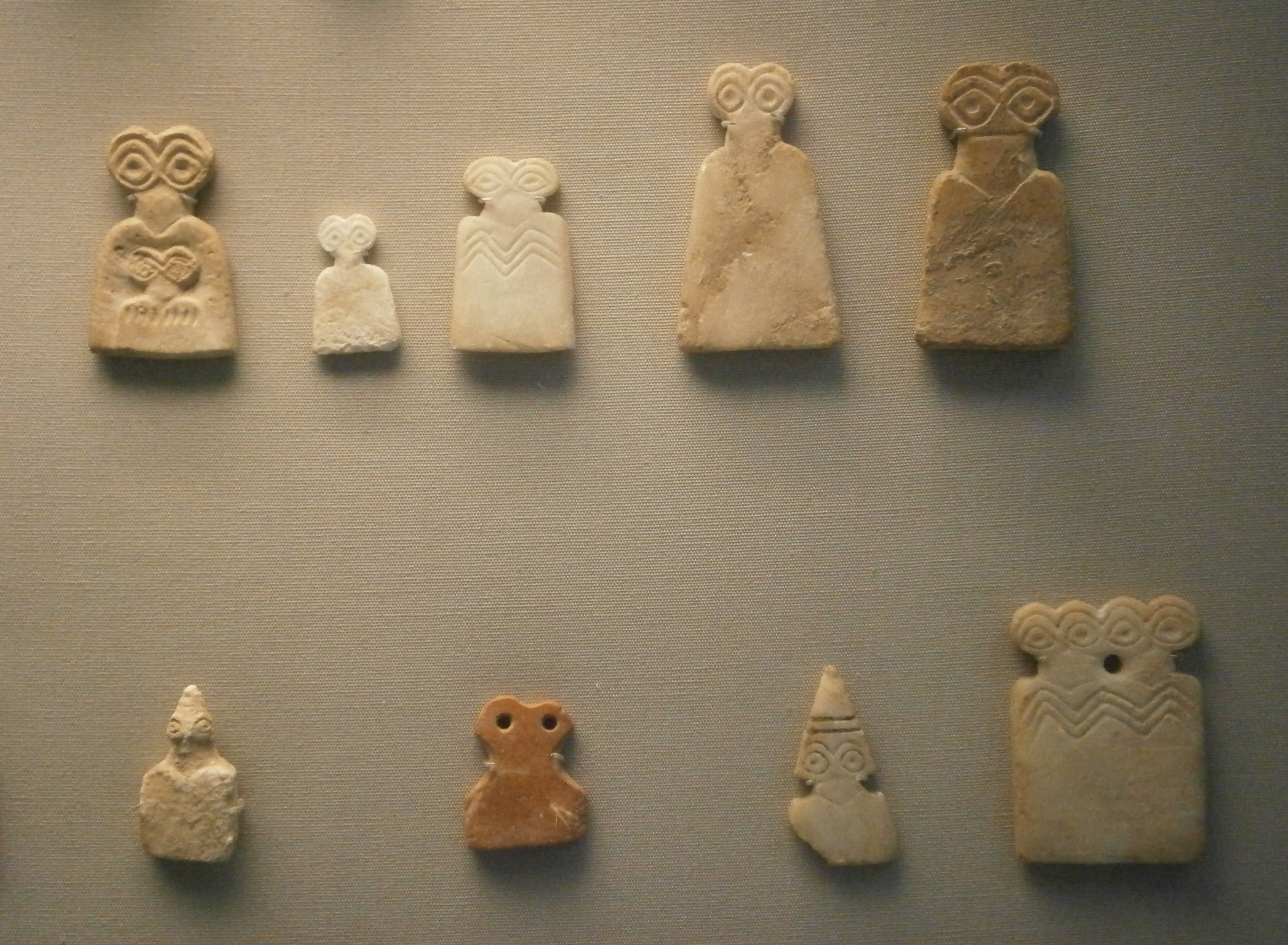
Examples of idols with alabaster eyes, discovered in the "eye temple" at Tell Brak. Around the middle of the 4th millennium BC. British Museum - London.

At Tepe Gawra, the architecture of the large tripartite houses was reused for ritual purposes and became temples, often associated with fortified buildings, most likely under the control of an elite who could thus exercise political activity and mobilize labor and its production by acting as priests, sponsors of shrines, or in the name of deities. In this way, the communal character once associated with the great tripartite houses of the Ubaid period is preserved, but used to legitimize the new, closely linked secular and sacred "officials". The tripartite houses that housed the gatherings so dear to Ubaid communities have been replaced by growing, irregular clusters of buildings whose dimensions seem to reflect individual preferences rather than community rules and conventions.

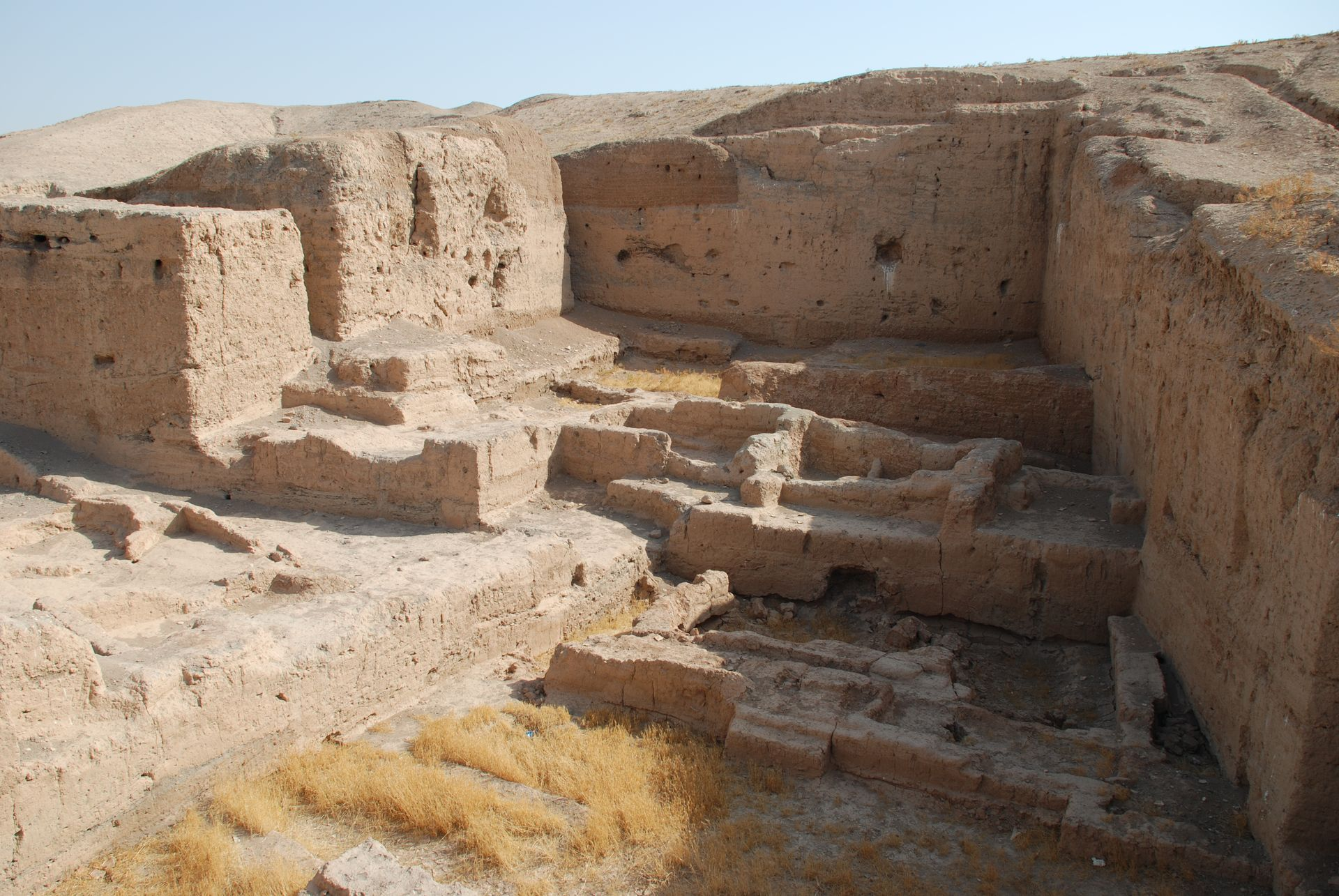
Excavation of Late Chalcolithic buildings (TW zone) at Tell Brak

In the 4th millennium BC, the northern zone of Tell Brak was also a major example of urban expansion: the entire 45-hectare of Tell was occupied. During this phase, an accumulation of dwellings formed a "ring" around the site, probably indicating a 100-hectare urban agglomeration. On the other hand, the smallest sites in the vicinity, measuring 5 hectares, seem to indicate a system in which Tell Brak exercised political and economic domination over the surrounding communities. There is also evidence of monumental architecture associated with institutional religion: notably the early phases of the "Temple with eyes" dating from the beginning of the 4th millennium BC, with its hundreds of small "idols with eyes". This temple was contemporary with the equally impressive building at Hammam et-Turkman, on the Belikh River in northern Syria, with 2-metre-thick walls and a buttressed façade.

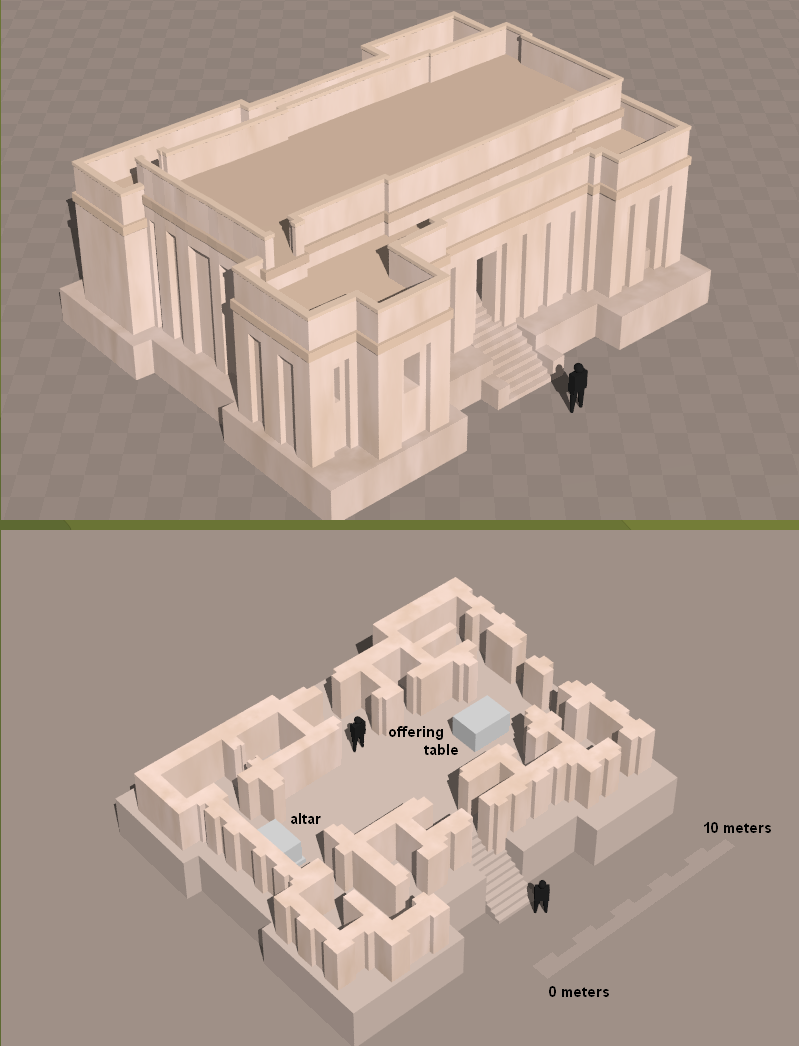
Reconstruction of the Level VII temple at Eridu, late 5th millennium BC, a monumental edifice with a tripartite plan characteristic of the Late Chalcolithic period

In the south, the existence of temples has been confirmed, especially at Eridu, where the oldest of them, built around 5000 BC during the Ubaid period, was discovered under the Ziggurat. Eridu, Tell Dlehim and Tell al-Hayyad cover between 40 and 50 hectares, while Uruk covers more than 70 hectares. Around 3400 BC, Uruk saw the appearance of a major architectural monument in the E-anna district. These were undoubtedly a number of formal public buildings, whose specific economic or religious purpose remains a matter of conjecture since, unfortunately for historians, they were emptied of their contents when the upper level was built. The surrounding enclosure covers an area of 8 to 9 hectares, and some of the buildings are decorated with cone mosaics.

=== Writing and numbers ===
Writing was the most significant advance of the 4th millennium BC. Initially highly symbolic, it is highly probable that this was an extension of the use of stone tokens or clay bowls on which a symbol was carved or printed. However, it has not yet been formally established that tokens preceded tablets, and they could just as well have been used to print clay tablets, in order to standardize the use of symbols. Alongside writing, a numerical system was developed, most probably to count livestock, cereals and dairy products, or to establish a calendar. Counting was based on a sexagesimal system, and its use probably began with the use of geometric tokens that were later printed on clay tablets. Although there is as yet no proof, the tokens found at Tell Abada could be the precursors of this counting system. Traditionally, it is the appearance of writing that marks the end of prehistory, although according to the current state of research it appears more as a symbolic marker or culmination of the process of the emergence of the state and cities, which characterizes the transition from prehistory to history in the truest sense of the word.

== Migratory and cultural expansion ==
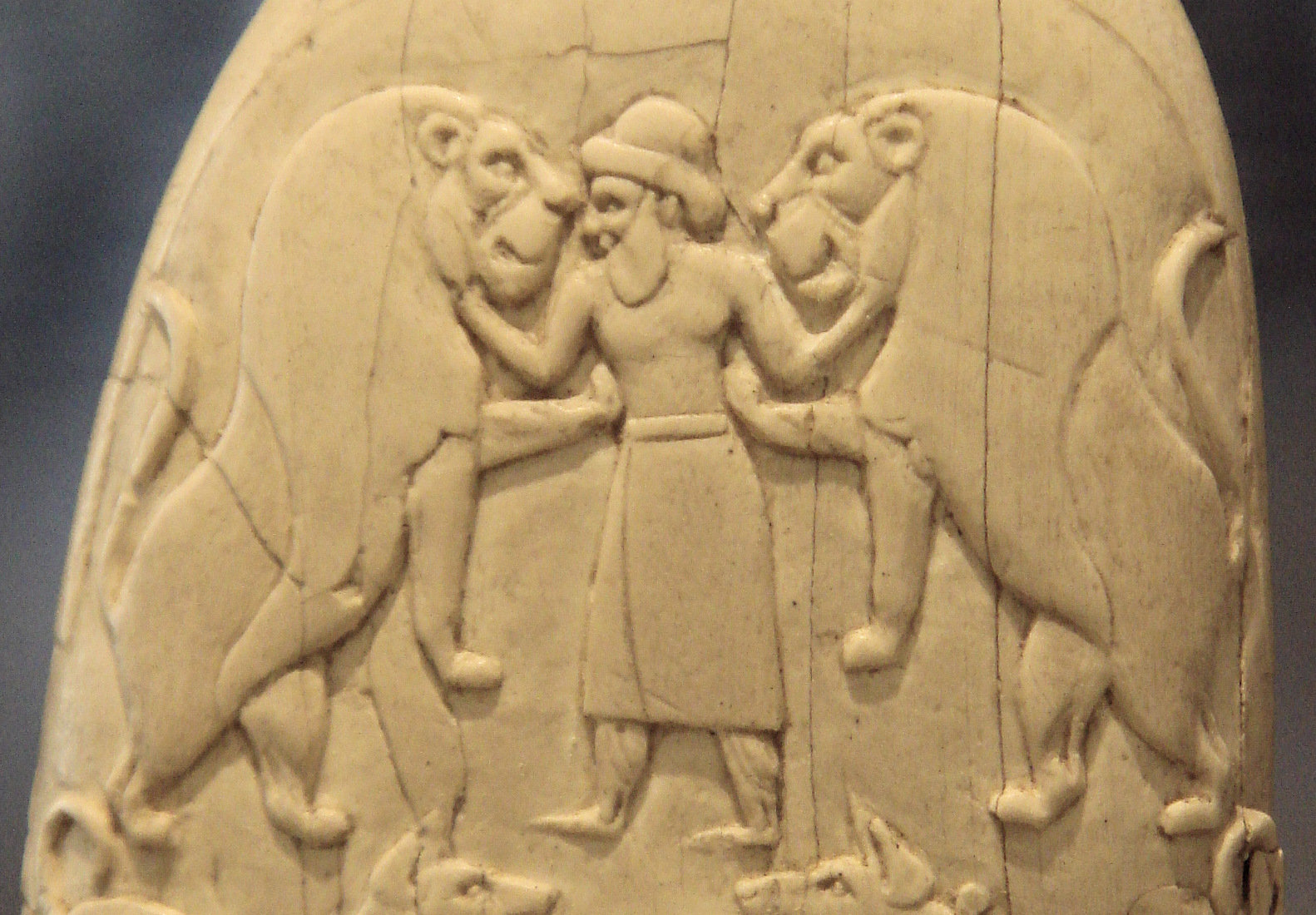
Mesopotamian king on an Egyptian prehistoric object, the Gebel el-Arak Knife (3300–3200 BCE).

A 2022 DNA study showed evidence of gene flow from the Mesopotamian and Zagros regions into surrounding areas, including Anatolia, during the Neolithic.

For the first time in 2025, a study was able to give insights into the genetic background of Early Dynastic Egyptians, by sequencing the whole genome of an adult male Egyptian of relatively high-status, radiocarbon-dated to 2855–2570 BCE at the junction between the Early Dynastic period and the Old Kingdom period, which was excavated in Nuwayrat (Nuerat, نويرات), in a cliff 265 km south of Cairo. Most of his genome was found to be associated with North African Neolithic ancestry, but about 20% of his genetic ancestry could be sourced to the eastern Fertile Crescent, including Mesopotamia.

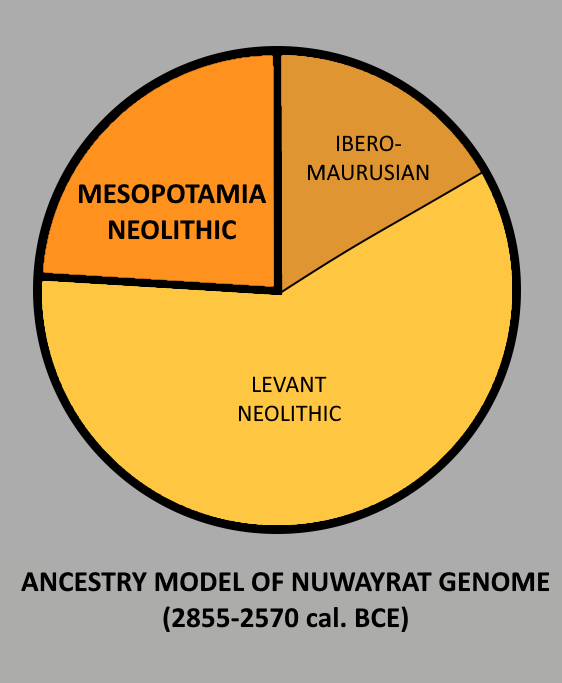
Ancestry model of Egyptian genome from Nuwayrat.

The genetic profile was most closely represented by a two-source model, in which 77.6% ± 3.8% of the ancestry corresponded to genomes from the Middle Neolithic Moroccan site of Skhirat-Rouazi (dated to 4780–4230 BCE), accounting for the local Egyptian Neolithic populations, while the remainder (22.4% ± 3.8%) was most closely related to known genomes from Neolithic Mesopotamia (dated to 9000-8000 BCE).

Cultural exchange and trade between Mesopotamia and Egypt were ongoing throughout the 4th millennium BCE, as shown by the transfer of Mesopotamian Late Uruk period features to the Nile Valley of the later Predynastic Period. Migrations flows from Mesopotamia accompanied such cultural exchanges, possibly through the sea routes of the Mediterranean and the Red Sea or through yet un-sampled intermediaries in the Levant. This genetic connection suggests that there had been ancient migration flows from the eastern Fertile Crescent to Egypt, in addition to the exchanges of objects and imagery (domesticated animals and plants, writing systems...) already observed. This suggests a pattern of wide cultural and demographic expansion from the Mesopotamian region, which affected both Anatolia and Egypt during this period.

== See also ==
- History of Mesopotamia
- Neolithic in the Near East
- Prehistory of Anatolia
- Prehistory of the Levant
- Prehistory of Iran

== Bibliography ==
- Peter M. M. G. Akkermans and Glenn M. Schwartz, The Archaeology of Syria: From complex hunter-gatherers to early urban societies (c.16,000-300 B.C.), Cambridge, Cambridge University Press, 2003 ISBN 978-0-521-79666-8.
- ^{(fr)} Olivier Aurenche and Stefan K. Kozlowski, La Naissance du Néolithique au Proche-Orient, Paris, CNRS Éditions, coll. "Biblis", October 2015, 343 p. ISBN 978-2-271-08601-3.
- ^{(fr)} Pascal Butterlin, Architecture et société au Proche-Orient ancien: Les bâtisseurs de mémoire en Mésopotamie (7000-3000 av. J.-C.), Paris, Picard, 2018 ISBN 978-2-7084-1038-1.
- Stuart Campbell, "Northern Mesopotamia", in D.T. Potts, A Companion To The Archealogy of the Ancient Near East, Oxford, Blackwell Publishing Ltd. 2012 ISBN 978-1-4051-8988-0.
- Petr Charvát, Mesopotamia Before History, London and New York, Routledge, 2002, 298 p. ISBN 978-0-415-48724-5.
- ^{(fr)} Jean-Louis Huot, Une archéologie des peuples du Proche-Orient, vol. I: Des peuples villageois aux cités-États (Xe-IIIe millénaire av. J.-C.), Paris, Errance, coll. "Civilisations et cultures", 2004 ISBN 978-2-87772-268-1.
- Roger Matthews, The Early Prehistory of Mesopotamia 500,000 to 4,500 B.C., Turnhout, Brepols, coll. " Subartu " (no V), 2000, 149 p. ISBN 978-2-503-50729-3.
- Joan Oates, "Southern Mesopotamia", in D.T. Potts, A Companion To The Archealogy of the Ancient Near East, Oxford, Blackwell Publishing Ltd. 2012 ISBN 978-1-4051-8988-0.
- Joan Oates, "Prehistory and the Rise of Cities in Mesopotamia and Iran", in Colin Renfrew (ed.), The Cambridge World Prehistory, Cambridge, Cambridge University Press, 2014, pp. 1474-1497.
- ^{(fr)} Georges Roux, La Mésopotamie, Paris, Éditions du Seuil, coll. "Points Histoire", 1985, 600 p. ISBN 978-2-02-023636-2.
- ^{(fr)} James C. Scott (trans. by Marc Saint-Upéry, pref. Jean-Paul Demoule), Homo Domesticus: Une histoire profonde des premiers États ["Against the Grain"], Paris, La Découverte, coll. "Sciences humaines et sociales" (no. 530), January 2021 (1st ed. 2019), 328 p.
