= Palaeolithic Era in Iran =

Persian Stone Age

The Palaeolithic Era in Iran is the prehistory of Iran in the period from c. 800,000 BCE to c. 11,000 BCE and can be divided into the Lower Paleolithic, Middle Paleolithic and Upper Paleolithic periods.

== Lower Paleolithic Period ==
- c. 800,000-200,000 BCE: Prehistoric hominins lived in the Iranian plateau specifically in Baqbaqu near Kashafrud, Kanisib near Piranshahr, Ganj Par and Darband Caves in Gilan, and Shiwatoo near Mahabad.

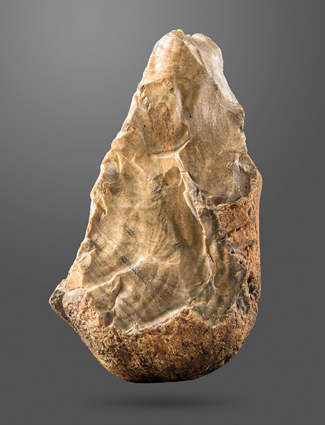
Biface (trihedral) Amar Merdeg, Mehran, Lower Paleolithic, National Museum of Iran

== Middle Paleolithic Period ==
- c. 200,000-40,000 BCE: Mousterian culture was present in both Zagros and central Iran during this period. according to archaeological evidence from Bisitun Cave, Neanderthal Man was present in the Zagros range during this period. The most well known sites of this period are Tamtameh Cave in the provinces of Azerbaijan, Ghamari Cave, Gar Arjeneh Rock Shelter, Kunji Cave, Gilvaran Cave and Kaldar Cave in Luristan, Kiaram cave in Gorgan, Kobeh, Warwasi, Do-Ashkaft Cave, Bisitun Cave, Mar Tarik in Kermanshah, Niasar and Kaftar Khoun, and Qaleh Bozi in Esfahan.

== Upper Paleolithic Period ==
- c. 35000: Zagros mountains, in Pa Sangar, Arjeneh caves at Luristan, as well as Mar Ruz, Mar Gorgalan Sarab, Dar Mar, Gogel, at Hulailan valley, Ghar-i-Khar, Warwasi, Malaverd, and Warkaini caves in the vicinity of Kermanshah, Eshkaft Gavi near Shiraz, Boof Cave near Dasht-e Rostam and Sefid-Ab near Kashan. Blade and Bladelet tools characteristic of Upper Palaeolithic period were made and used.
- c. 13000-11000 BCE: Hunters and fishers appeared along the Zagros mountains such as Warwasi, Pa Sangar and Shalam, and central and northern Iran, specifically at ‘’Kamarband’’, ‘’Hotu’’, and ‘’Ali Tappeh’’ caves. Various bladelets made of flint were made and used in this period, which were both smaller and more sophisticated than those made in the earlier periods.

== See also ==
- List of years in Iran
- Prehistory of Iran
