= List of archaeological sites in Iran =

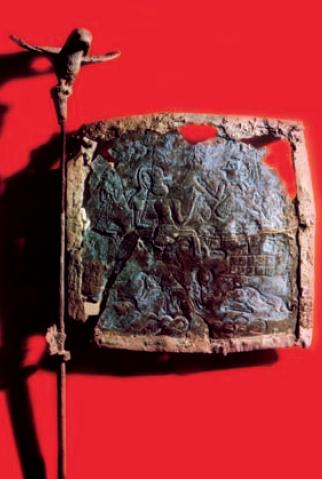
Bronze flag, Shahdad Kerman, Iran, 3rd millennium BC

Some of the prehistoric archaeological sites of Iran are listed below:

- Paleolithic
  - Hotu and Kamarband Caves
  - Darband Cave
  - Qal'eh Bozi
  - Do-Ashkaft Cave
  - Warwasi
  - Bisitun Cave
  - Kashafrud
  - Kani Sib
- Neolithic
  - Tappeh Sialk
  - Ganj Dareh
  - Ali Kosh
  - Hajji Firuz Tepe
- Jiroft culture (3rd millennium BC)
  - Konar Sandal
  - Shahdad
  - Shahr-e Sukhteh
- Lullubi culture (3rd to 2nd millennia BC)
  - Sarpol-e Zahab
- Elam (3rd to 2nd millennia BC)
  - Anshan
  - Chogha Zanbil
  - Godin Tepe
  - Haft Tepe
  - Susa
  - Khorramabad
- Assyria
  - Tappeh Hasanlu
- Median to Achaemenid period
  - Ecbatana
  - Persepolis
  - Behistun
  - Rey, Iran
  - Pasargadae
  - Temukan
  - Bābā Jān Tepe
  - Marlik
  - Qaleh Kesh
- Sassanid period
  - Takht-e Soleymān
  - Kohneh Lahijan
  - Istakhr
  - Great Wall of Gorgan
  - Qal'eh Dokhtar
  - Qumis, Iran

== See also ==
- List of archaeological sites sorted by country
- History of Iran
- Rock art in Iran
