= Prehistory of Iran =

The prehistory of the Iranian plateau is conventionally divided into the Paleolithic, Epipaleolithic, Neolithic, Chalcolithic, Bronze Age and Iron Age periods. It spans the time from the first settlement by archaic humans, about a million years ago, to the beginning of the historical record during the Neo-Assyrian Empire, in the 8th century BC. It is a part of the broader prehistory of the Near East.

== Paleolithic ==
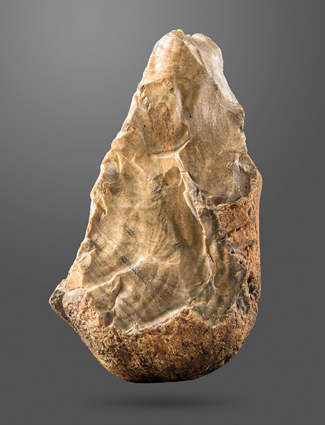
Biface (trihedral) Amar Merdeg, Mehran, Lower Paleolithic, National Museum of Iran

One of the potential routes for early human migrations toward southern and eastern Asia is Iran, a country characterized by a wide range of geographic variation and resources, which could support early groups of hominins who wandered into the region. Evidence of these early populations includes stone artifacts discovered in gravel deposits along the Kashafrud River Basin in eastern Iran, the Mashkid and Ladiz Rivers in the southeast, the Sefidrud River in the north, the Mahabad River in the northwest, along with isolated finds in the west and northwestern parts of the country. The main early human occupation sites in Iran are: Kashafrud in Khorasan, Mashkid and Ladiz in Sistan, Shiwatoo in Kurdistan, Ganj Par in Gilan, Darband Cave in Gilan, Khaleseh in Zanjan, Tepe Gakia (34°13′N 47°13′E) 14 km (8.7 mi) due east of Kermanshah, Pal Barik in Ilam. These sites date from one million to 200,000 years ago. Mousterian Stone tools made by Neanderthal man have been found in various parts of the country. There are more cultural remains of Neanderthal man dating back to the Middle Paleolithic period in the Zagros region and in central Iran at sites such as Kobeh, Kaldar, Bisetun, Qaleh Bozi, Tamtama, Warwasi. In 1949 a Neanderthal radius was discovered by CS Coon in Bisitun Cave.

Evidence for Upper Paleolithic and Epipaleolithic periods are known mainly from the Zagros region in the caves of Kermanshah and Khorramabad such as Yafteh Cave and a few sites in the Alborz range and Central Iran. In October 2018, the tooth of a six year old Neanderthal child was discovered in Iran together with tools of the middle Paleolithic period in the mountains of Kermanshah province.

== Epipaleolithic ==
The end of the Palaeolithic, called Epipalaeolithic, is in a period of about 7000 years from c. 18,000 to 11,000 BC. In those days groups of hunter-gatherers were mostly living in the caves of the Zagros Mountains. Compared to earlier groups of game hunters, a tendency towards increasing the number of the kinds of plants and animals, which were collected and hunted, can be observed. Not only smaller vertebrates were hunted but also pistachios and wild fruit were collected. Finally, consuming snails and smaller aquatic animals like crabs is new (Flannery 1973).

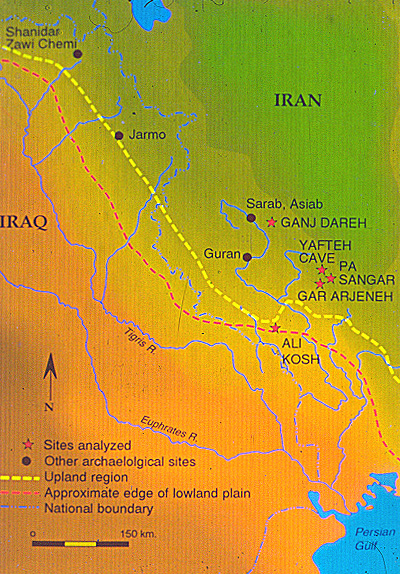
Map showing location of Ganj Dareh and other early Neolithic sites in western Zagros.

== Neolithic to Chalcolithic ==
Almost nothing is known about the 2500 years which followed the Epipalaeolithic after 11,000 BC. Only when discovering the place of Asiab (c. 8500–8000) in the Kermanshah area are we in better known periods. Asiab was a small camp of hunter-gatherers, only seasonally inhabited. Besides the fact that wild goats and sheep were hunted, great numbers of snail shells were found. These finds were interpreted in the way that from time to time the hunting activities of the inhabitants of Asiab were unsuccessful and that then they were forced to consume food which they usually did not like.

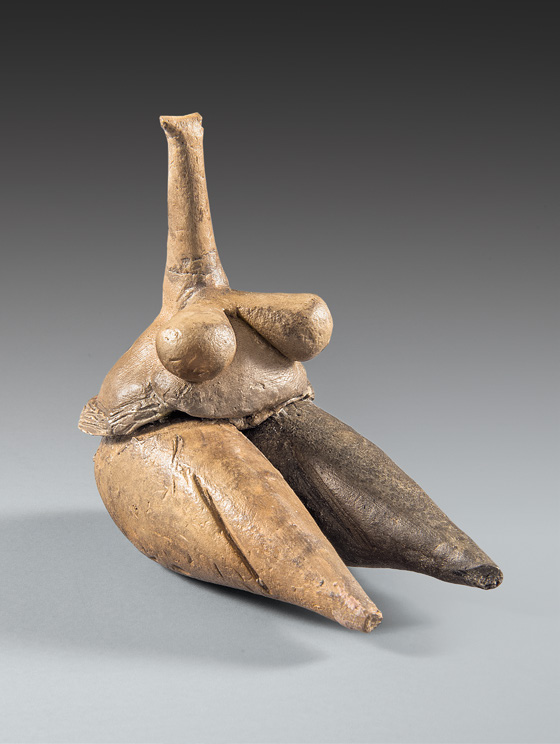
Clay human figurine (Fertility goddess) Tappeh Sarab, Kermanshah ca. 7000–6100 BC, Neolithic period, National Museum of Iran

Some nearby and more constantly occupied settlements in the Zagros date from a short time after Asiab, from the time between 8,000 and 6,800 BC. Still the material culture of Tappeh Ganj Dareh and Tappeh Abdul Hosein does not include any pottery. Thus this period is often called “aceramic Neolithic”. This is also true for the oldest levels of Tappeh Guran, located in Lorestan, as well as for the sites of Ali Kosh and Chogha Sefid in the plain of Deh Luran, west of the Zagros Mountains. There, flocks of sheep and herds of goats were kept for the first time. Managing animals meant a fundamentally new orientation of the Neolithic inhabitants of Iran and must be understood to be connected with a whole number of other innovations, particularly the architecture of houses. We do not definitely know if in those days there was any cultivation of cereals. Tools for harvesting and for making cereal products are there, but remnants of burned grain are extremely rare.

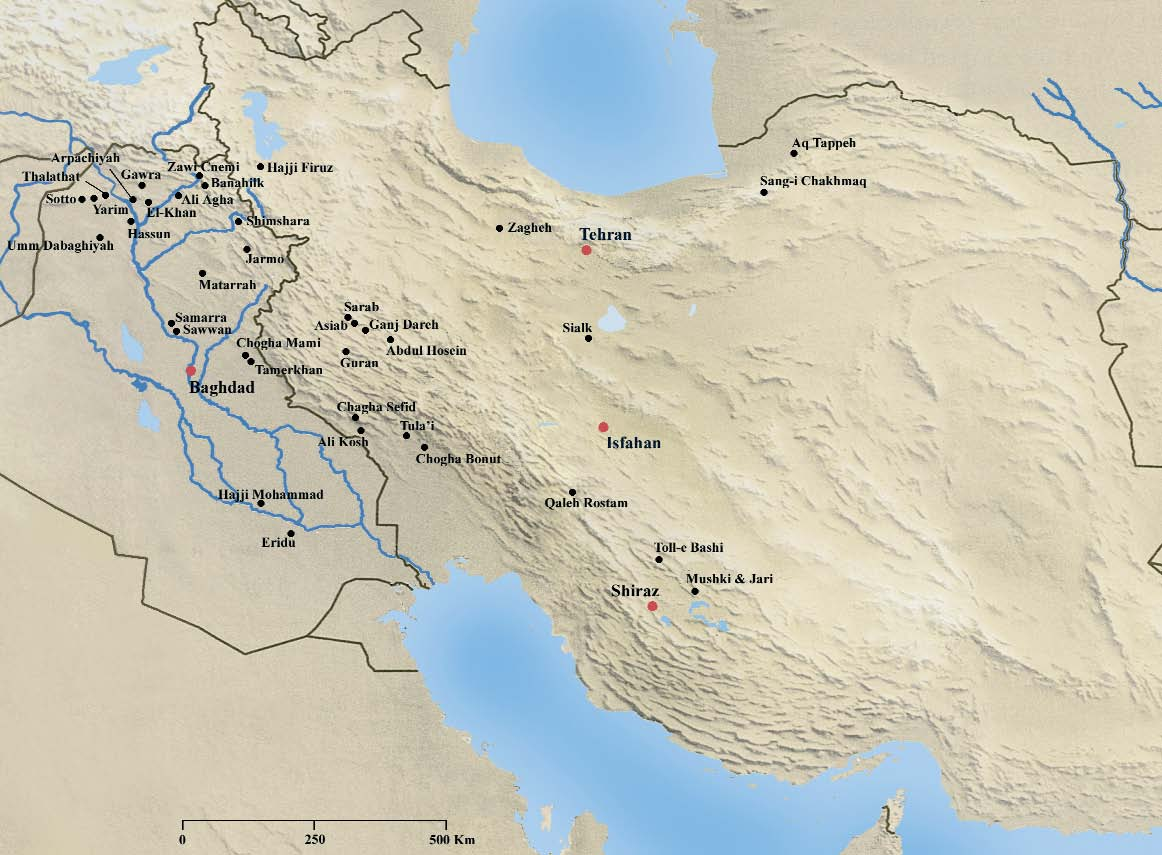
Neolithic sites in Iran

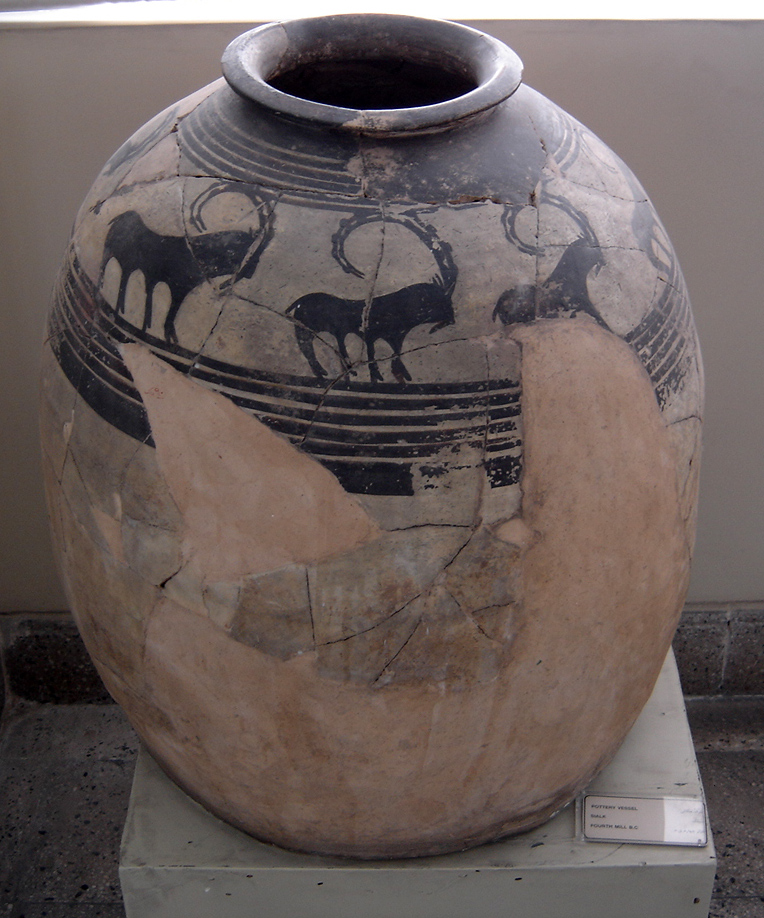
Pottery vessel, fourth millennium B.C. Zagros National Museum of Iran.

In the eighth millennium BC, agricultural communities such as Chogha Bonut (the earliest village in Susiana) started to form in western Iran, either as a result of indigenous development or of outside influences. Around about the same time the earliest known clay vessels and modeled human and animal terracotta figurines were produced at Ganj Dareh and Teppe Sarab, also in western Iran. The south-western part of Iran was part of the Fertile Crescent. Some of the oldest agricultural ground has been discovered in Susa (now a city still existing since 7000 BC) and settlements such as Chogha Mish, dating back to 6800 BC; there are 7,000-year-old jars of wine excavated in the Zagros Mountains (now on display at The University of Pennsylvania) and ruins of 7,000-year-old settlements such as Sialk are further testament to that.

Early agricultural communities such as Chogha Golan in 10,000 BC along with settlements such as Chogha Bonut (the earliest village in Elam) in 8000 BC, began to flourish in and around the Zagros Mountains region in western Iran. Around about the same time, the earliest-known clay vessels and modeled human and animal terracotta figurines were produced at Ganj Dareh, also in western Iran. There are also 10,000-year-old human and animal figurines from Tepe Sarab in Kermanshah Province among many other ancient artifacts.

The south-western part of Iran was part of the Fertile Crescent where most of humanity's first major crops were grown, in villages such as Susa (where a settlement was first founded possibly as early as 4395 cal BC) and settlements such as Chogha Mish, dating back to 6800 BC; there are 7,000-year-old jars of wine excavated in the Zagros Mountains (now on display at the University of Pennsylvania) and ruins of 7000-year-old settlements such as Tepe Sialk are further testament to that.

== Bronze Age ==
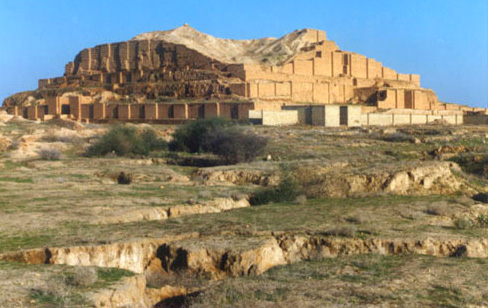
Chogha Zanbil is one of the few extant ziggurats outside of Mesopotamia and is considered to be the best preserved example in the world.

Parts of what is modern-day northwestern Iran was part of the Kura–Araxes culture (circa 3400 BC—ca. 2000 BC), that stretched up into the neighboring regions of the Caucasus and Anatolia.

Susa is one of the oldest-known settlements of Iran and the world. Based on C14 dating, the time of foundation of the city is as early as 4395 BC, a time that goes beyond the age of civilization in Mesopotamia. The general perception among archeologists is that Susa was an extension of the Sumerian city state of Uruk. In its later history, Susa became the capital of Elam, which emerged as a state found 4000 BC. There are also dozens of prehistoric sites across the Iranian plateau pointing to the existence of ancient cultures and urban settlements in the fourth millennium BC.

One of the earliest civilizations in Iranian plateau was the Jiroft culture in southeastern Iran in the province of Kerman. It is one of the most artifact-rich archaeological sites in the Middle East. Archaeological excavations in Jiroft led to the discovery of several objects belonging to the 4th millennium BC. There is a large quantity of objects decorated with highly distinctive engravings of animals, mythological figures, and architectural motifs. The objects and their iconography are unlike anything ever seen before by archeologists. Many are made from chlorite, a gray-green soft stone; others are in copper, bronze, terracotta, and even lapis lazuli. Some Iranian archeologists believe the discovered inscription is the most ancient script found so far, predating these others, and that the Elamite written language originated in Jiroft, where the writing system developed first and was then spread across the country.

There are records of numerous other ancient civilizations on the Iranian Plateau before the emergence of Iranian peoples during the Early Iron Age. The Early Bronze Age saw the rise of urbanization into organized city states and the invention of writing (the Uruk period) in the Near East. While Bronze Age Elam made use of writing from an early time, the Proto-Elamite script remains undeciphered, and records from Sumer pertaining to Elam are scarce.

Russian historian Igor M. Diakonoff stated that the modern inhabitants of Iran are descendants of mainly non-Indo-European groups, more specifically of pre-Iranic inhabitants of the Iranian Plateau: "It is the autochthones of the Iranian plateau, and not the Proto-Indo-European tribes of Europe, which are, in the main, the ancestors, in the physical sense of the word, of the present-day Iranians."

== Early Iron Age ==
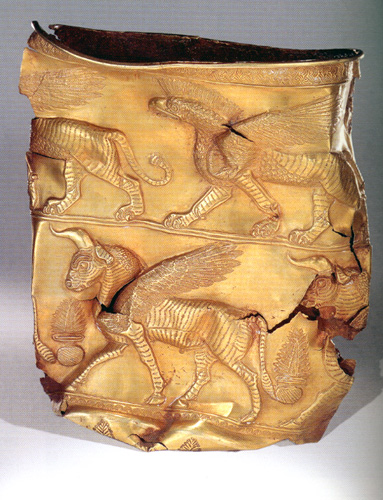
A gold cup at the National Museum of Iran, dating from the first half of 1st millennium BC

Records become more tangible with the rise of the Neo-Assyrian Empire and its records of incursions from the Iranian plateau. As early as the 20th century BC, tribes came to the Iranian Plateau from the Pontic–Caspian steppe. The arrival of Iranians on the Iranian plateau forced the Elamites to relinquish one area of their empire after another and to take refuge in Elam, Khuzestan and the nearby area, which only then became coterminous with Elam. Bahman Firuzmandi say that the southern Iranians might be intermixed with the Elamite peoples living in the plateau. By the mid-first millennium BC, Medes, Persians, and Parthians populated the Iranian plateau. Until the rise of the Medes, they all remained under Assyrian domination, like the rest of the Near East. In the first half of the first millennium BC, parts of what is now Iranian Azerbaijan were incorporated into Urartu.

== See also ==
- Prehistoric Asia
- Rock art in Iran
