= Qeysvand =

Qeysvand or Qeysavand or Qeysevand (Persian: قيسوند) may refer to:

- Qeysevand, Kermanshah
- Qeysevand, Kuzaran, Kermanshah County, Kermanshah Province
- Qeysvand, Harsin, Kermanshah Province
