= Outline of Iran =

Country in West Asia and the Middle East

The location of Iran

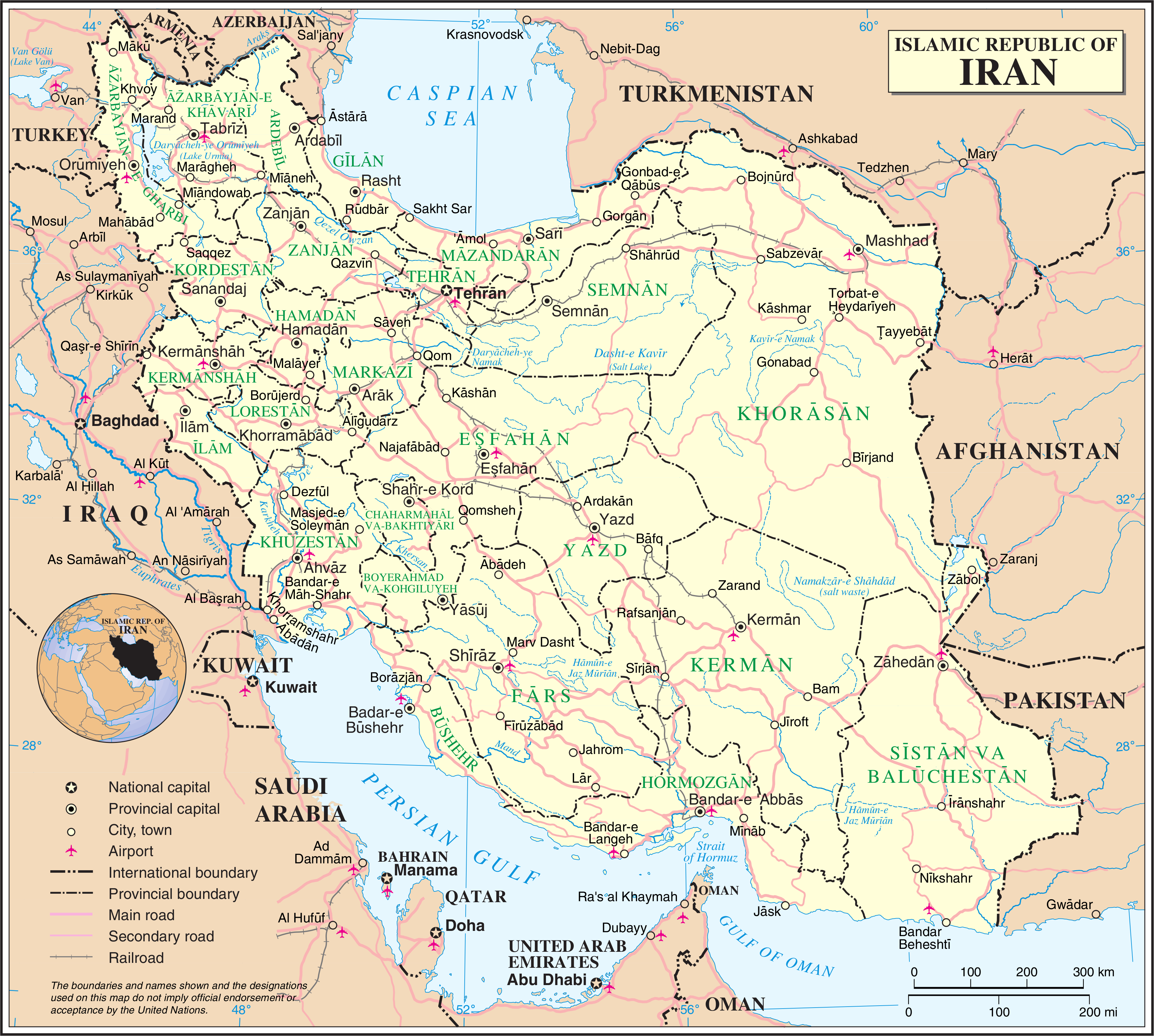
An enlargeable map of the Islamic Republic of Iran

The following outline serves as an overview and topical guide to Iran:

Iran – sovereign country located in West Asia and the Middle East. Iran is bounded by the Gulf of Oman and the Persian Gulf to the south and the Caspian Sea to its north. Shi'a Islam is the official religion, and Persian is the official language. Iran has a population of about 83,500,000; and is the 18th largest country in the world in terms of area at 1,648,195 square kilometres (636,372 sq mi). Iran is home to one of the world's oldest continuous major civilizations, with historical and urban settlements dating back to 4000 BC. Throughout history, Iran has been of geostrategic importance because of its central location in Eurasia and is a regional power. The political system of Iran, based on the 1979 Constitution, comprises several intricately connected governing bodies. The highest state authority is the Supreme Leader, currently Ayatollah Mojtaba Khamenei.

== General reference ==
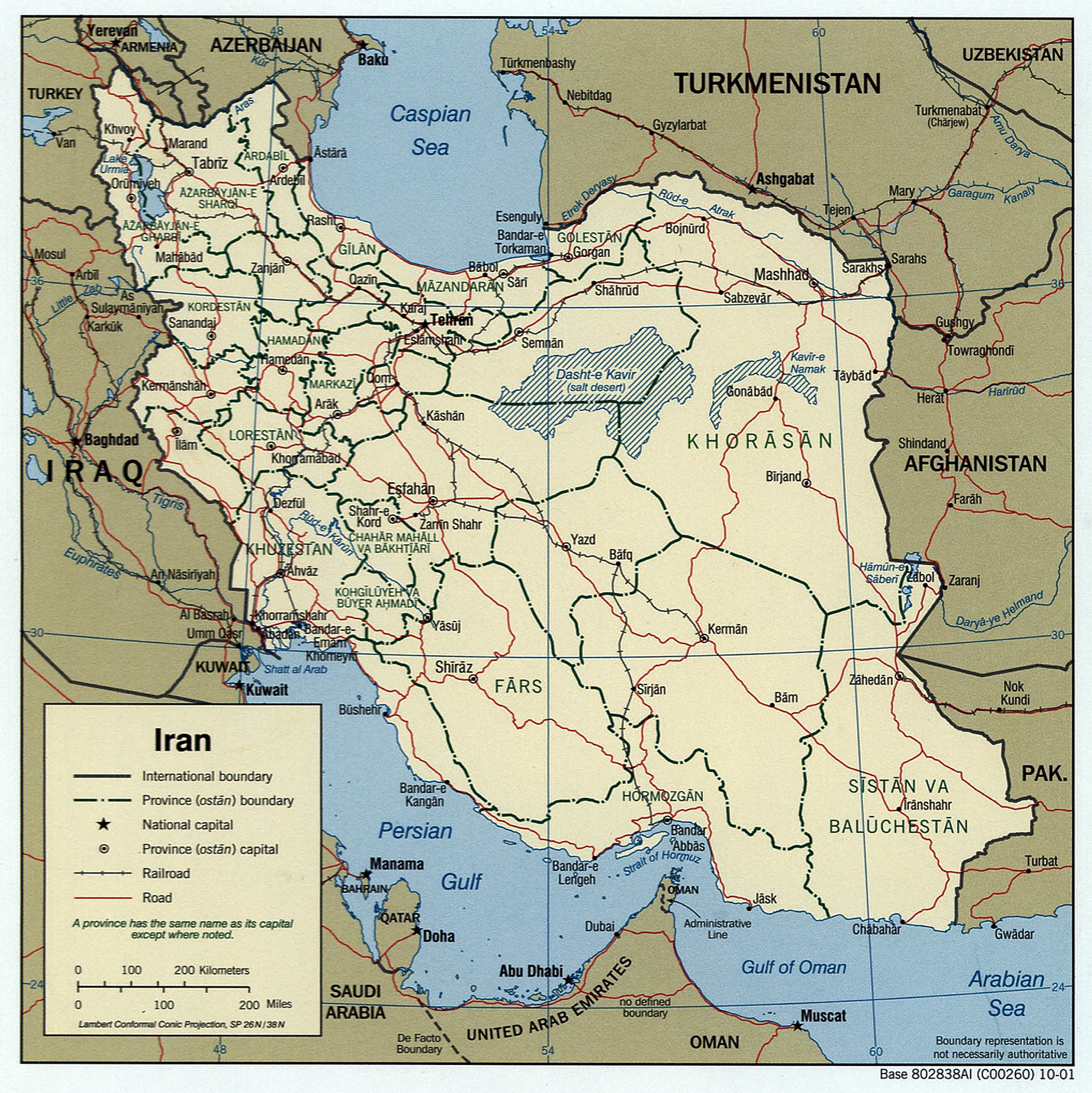
An enlargeable map of Iran

- Pronunciation:
- Common English country name: Iran, archaic Persia
- Official English country name: The Islamic Republic of Iran
- Common endonym(s):
- Official endonym(s):
- Adjectival(s): Iranian
- Demonym(s):
- Etymology: Name of Iran
- International rankings of Iran
  - 18th largest country
  - 17th most populous country
- ISO country codes: IR, IRN, 364
- ISO region codes: See ISO 3166-2:IR
- Internet country code top-level domain: .ir

== Geography of Iran ==
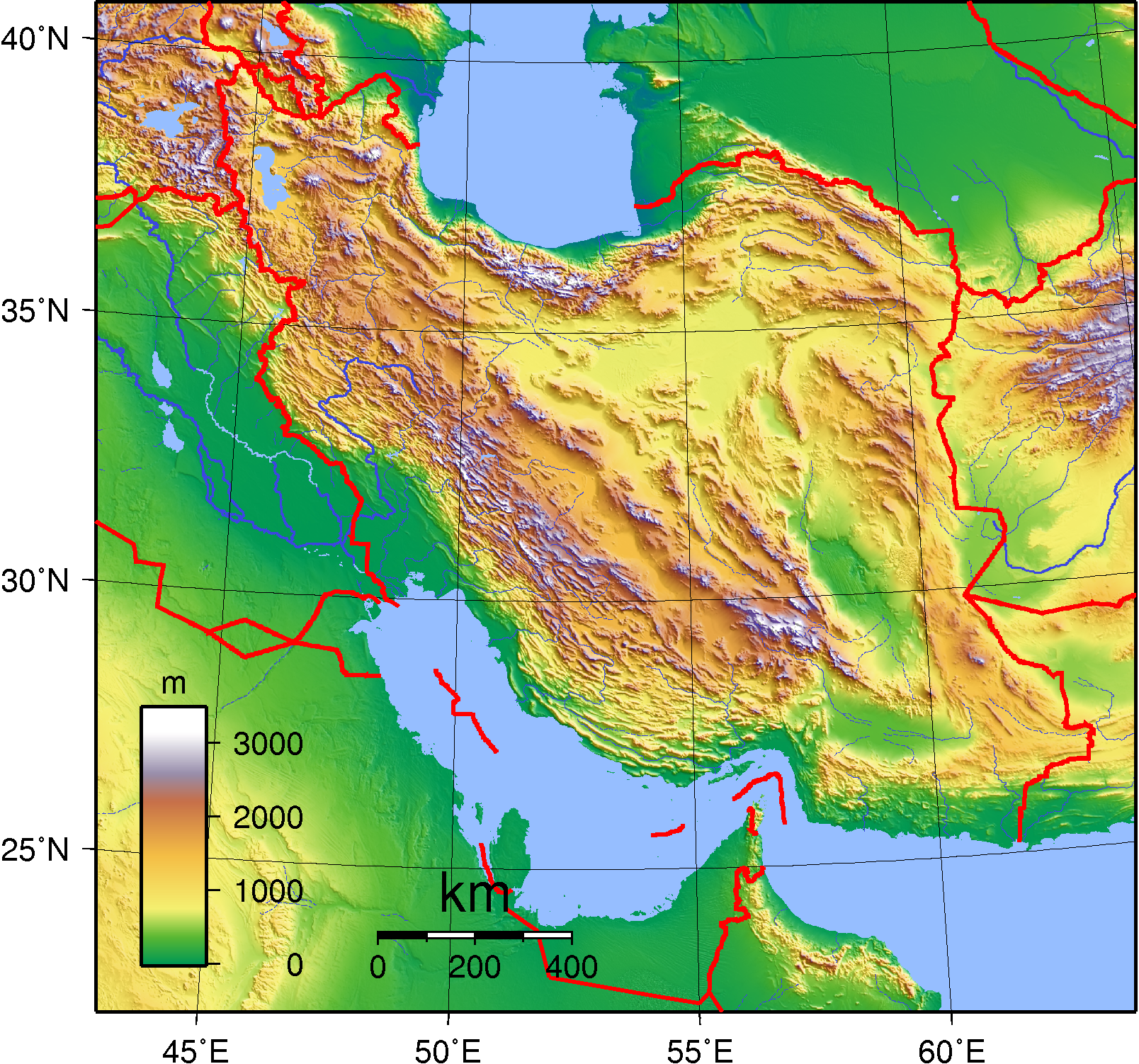
An enlargeable topographic map of Iran

Geography of Iran

- Iran is: a country
- Location:
  - Northern Hemisphere and Eastern Hemisphere
  - Eurasia
    - Asia
      - West Asia
    - Middle East
      - Iranian plateau
      - Armenian highlands
  - Caucasus (partly)
  - Time zone: Iran Standard Time UTC+03:30, Iran Daylight Time UTC+04:30
  - Extreme points of Iran
    - High: Damavand 5,610 m (18,406 ft)
    - Low: Caspian Sea −28 m (−92 ft)
  - Land boundaries: 5,440 km

Iraq 1,458 km
Turkmenistan 992 km
Afghanistan 950 km
Pakistan 950 km
Azerbaijan 611 km
Turkey 499 km
Armenia 35 km

- Coastline: 2,440 km

- Population of Iran: 79,966,230 people (2017 estimate) – 18th most populous country
- Area of Iran: 1,648,195 km^{2} (636,372 sq mi) – 18th largest country
- Atlas of Iran

=== Environment of Iran ===
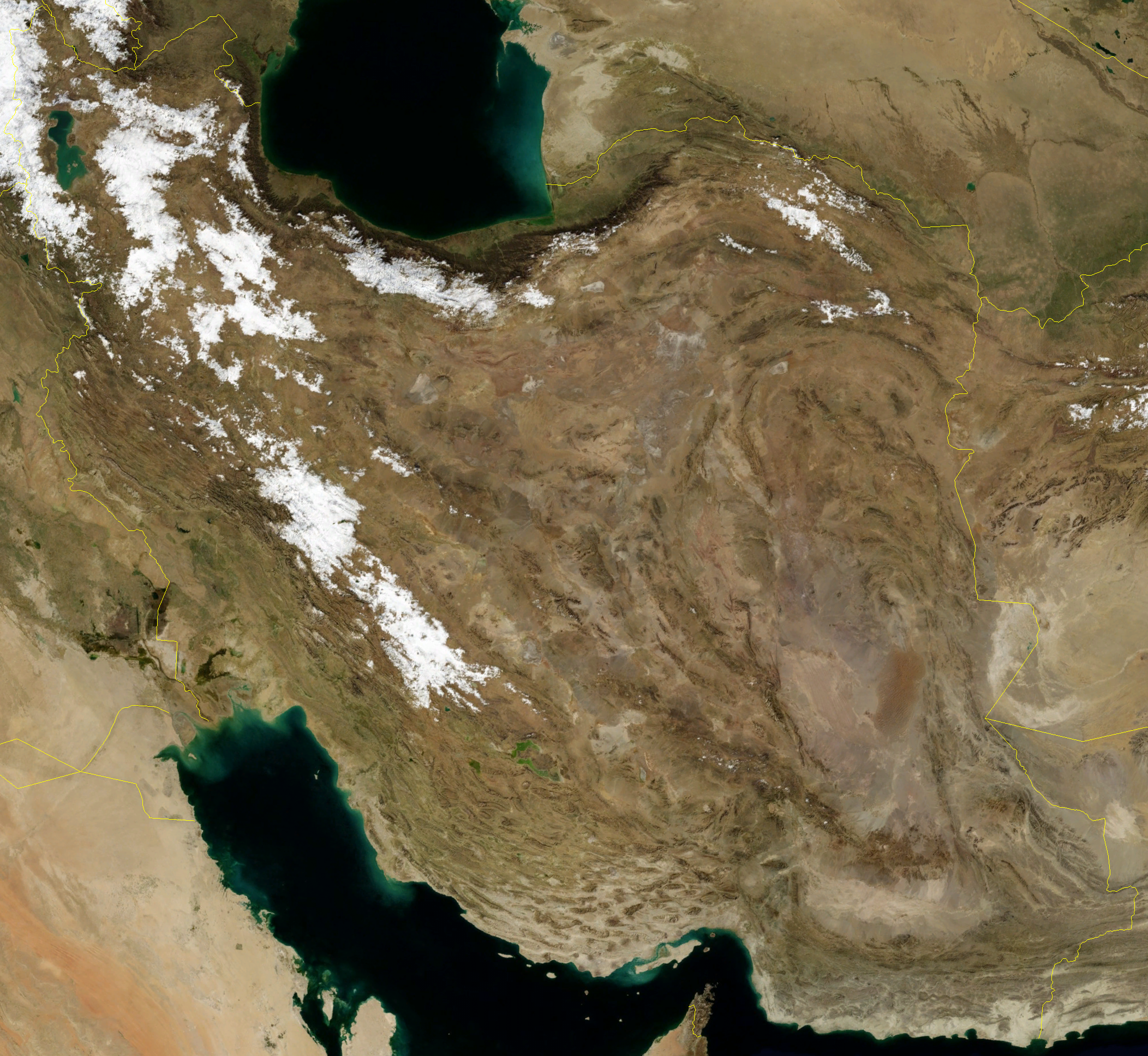
An enlargeable satellite image of Iran

Environment of Iran

- Climate of Iran
- Environmental issues in Iran
- Renewable energy in Iran
- Geology of Iran
  - List of earthquakes in Iran
- Protected areas of Iran
  - Biosphere reserves in Iran
  - National parks of Iran
- Wildlife of Iran
  - Fauna of Iran
    - Birds of Iran
    - Mammals of Iran

==== Natural geographic features of Iran ====
- Glaciers of Iran: None
- Islands of Iran
- Lakes of Iran
- Mountains of Iran
  - Volcanoes in Iran
- Rivers of Iran
  - Waterfalls of Iran
- Valleys of Iran
- List of World Heritage Sites in Iran

=== Regions of Iran ===
==== Ecoregions of Iran ====
List of ecoregions in Iran

==== Administrative divisions of Iran ====
Administrative divisions of Iran

- Provinces of Iran
  - Counties of Iran
    - Municipalities of Iran

===== Provinces of Iran =====
Provinces of Iran

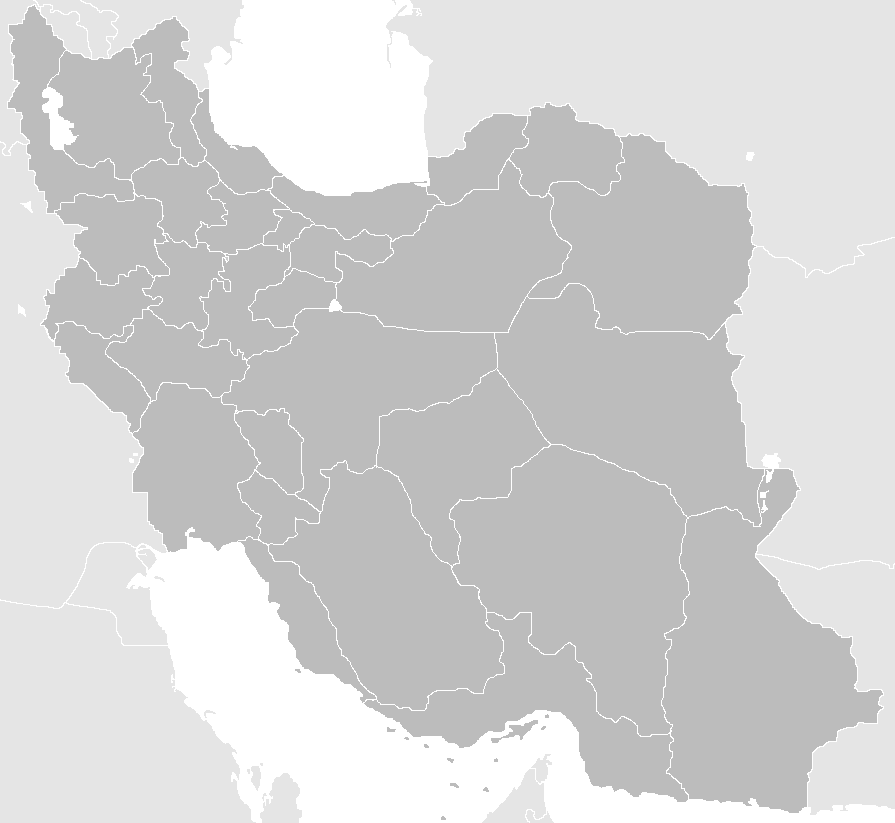

===== Counties of Iran =====
Counties of Iran

===== Municipalities of Iran =====
Municipalities of Iran

- Cities of Iran
  - Capital of Iran: Tehran

=== Demography of Iran ===
Demographics of Iran

== Government and politics of Iran ==
Politics of Iran

- Form of government: Islamic republic
- Capital of Iran: Tehran
- Elections in Iran
- Political parties in Iran
- Taxation in Iran

=== Branches of the government of Iran ===
Government of Iran

==== Executive branch of the government of Iran ====
- Assembly of Experts
  - Elects the Supreme Leader
  - Has the constitutional authority to remove the Supreme Leader from power at any time
  - Supervises the Supreme Leader in the performance of legal duties
- Head of state: Supreme Leader of Iran, Mojtaba Khamenei
- Head of government: President of Iran, Masoud Pezeshkian
- Vice President of Iran – anyone appointed by the President to lead an organization related to presidential affairs. There are currently 11 Vice Presidents in Iran:
  1. First Vice President, Mohammad Reza Aref
  2. Vice President and Head of Atomic Energy Organization of Iran, Mohammad Eslami
  3. Vice President and Head of Environmental Protection Organization, Ali Salajegheh
  4. Vice President and Head of Plan and Budget Organization, Davoud Manzour
  5. Vice President and Head of Administrative and Recruitment Affairs Organization, Meysam Latifi
  6. Vice President for Executive Affairs, Mohsen Mansouri
  7. Vice President for Science and Technology and Head of Iran's National Elites Foundation, Ruhollah Dehghani Firouz Abadi
  8. Vice President for Legal Affairs, Mohammad Dehghan
  9. Vice President for Parliamentary Affairs, Mohammad Hosseini
  10. Vice President and Head of Foundation of Martyrs and Veterans Affairs, Amir-Hossein Ghazizadeh Hashemi
  11. Vice President for Women and Family Affairs, Ensieh Khazali
- Council of Ministers of Iran
  1. Ministry of Agricultural, Mohammad Ali Nikbakht
  2. Ministry of Communications and Information Technology, Issa Zarepour
  3. Ministry of Cooperatives, Labour, and Social Welfare, Sowlat Mortazavi
  4. Minister of Culture and Islamic Guidance, Mohammad Mehdi Esmaili
  5. Ministry of Defense and Armed Forces Logistics, Mohammad-Reza Gharaei Ashtiani
  6. Ministry of Economic Affairs and Finance, Ehsan Khandozi
  7. Ministry of Education, Rezamorad Sahraei
  8. Ministry of Energy, Ali Akbar Mehrabian
  9. Ministry of Foreign Affairs, Hossein Amir-Abdollahian
  10. Minister of Health and Medical Education, Bahram Eynollahi
  11. Ministry of Industry, Mine and Trade, Abbas Aliabadi
  12. Ministry of Intelligence and National Security, Esmaeil Khatib
  13. Ministry of Interior, Ahmad Vahidi
  14. Ministry of Justice, Amin Hossein Rahimi
  15. Ministry of Petroleum, Javad Owji
  16. Ministry of Science, Research, and Technology, Mohammad Ali Zolfigol
  17. Ministry of Roads and Urban Development, Mehrdad Bazrpash
  18. Ministry of Youth Affairs and Sports, Kioumars Hashemi
  19. Ministry of Cultural Heritage, Handicrafts and Tourism, Ezzatollah Zarghami

==== Legislative branch of the government of Iran ====
- Majlis of Iran (unicameral parliament)
  - drafts legislation
  - ratifies international treaties
  - approves the national budget
- Guardian Council
  - 12 members
    - 6 appointed by the Supreme Leader
    - 6 elected by the Majlis
  - Powers and responsibilities:
    - Supervises elections
    - Approves or rejects candidates for president, Majlis, and the Assembly of Experts
    - Reviews all bills passed by the Majlis for constitutionality and compatibility with Islamic law, and approves or vetoes them
- Expediency Discernment Council
  - Appointed by Supreme Leader
  - Main purpose is to mediate disputes between the Majlis and the Council of Guardians
  - Also serves as an advisory board to the Supreme Leader

==== Judicial branch of the government of Iran ====
Judicial system of Iran

- Supreme Court of Iran
- Special Clerical Court – for trying Muslim clerics, and accountable only to the Supreme Leader

=== Foreign relations of Iran ===
- Foreign relations of Iran
- Arab League–Iran relations
- Diplomatic missions in Iran
- Iran–United States relations
- Iran–Israel proxy conflict

==== International organization membership ====
International organization membership of Iran

The Islamic Republic of Iran is a member of:

- BRICS
- Colombo Plan (CP)
- Economic Cooperation Organization (ECO)
- Food and Agriculture Organization (FAO)
- Group of 15 (G15)
- Group of 24 (G24)
- Group of 77 (G77)
- International Atomic Energy Agency (IAEA)
- International Bank for Reconstruction and Development (IBRD)
- International Chamber of Commerce (ICC)
- International Civil Aviation Organization (ICAO)
- International Criminal Court (ICCt) (signatory)
- International Criminal Police Organization (Interpol)
- International Development Association (IDA)
- International Federation of Red Cross and Red Crescent Societies (IFRCS)
- International Finance Corporation (IFC)
- International Fund for Agricultural Development (IFAD)
- International Hydrographic Organization (IHO)
- International Labour Organization (ILO)
- International Maritime Organization (IMO)
- International Mobile Satellite Organization (IMSO)
- International Monetary Fund (IMF)
- International Olympic Committee (IOC)
- International Organization for Migration (IOM)
- International Organization for Standardization (ISO)
- International Red Cross and Red Crescent Movement (ICRM)
- International Telecommunication Union (ITU)
- International Telecommunications Satellite Organization (ITSO)
- Inter-Parliamentary Union (IPU)
- Islamic Development Bank (IDB)
- Multilateral Investment Guarantee Agency (MIGA)
- Nonaligned Movement (NAM)
- Organisation of Islamic Cooperation (OIC)
- Organisation for the Prohibition of Chemical Weapons (OPCW)
- Organization of Petroleum Exporting Countries (OPEC)
- Permanent Court of Arbitration (PCA)
- Shanghai Cooperation Organisation (SCO)
- South Asian Association for Regional Cooperation (SAARC) (observer)
- United Nations (UN)
- United Nations Conference on Trade and Development (UNCTAD)
- United Nations Educational, Scientific, and Cultural Organization (UNESCO)
- United Nations High Commissioner for Refugees (UNHCR)
- United Nations Industrial Development Organization (UNIDO)
- United Nations Institute for Training and Research (UNITAR)
- Universal Postal Union (UPU)
- World Confederation of Labour (WCL)
- World Customs Organization (WCO)
- World Federation of Trade Unions (WFTU)
- World Health Organization (WHO)
- World Intellectual Property Organization (WIPO)
- World Meteorological Organization (WMO)
- World Tourism Organization (UNWTO)
- World Trade Organization (WTO) (observer)

=== Law and order in Iran ===
Law of Iran

- Capital punishment in Iran
- Constitution of Iran
- Crime in Iran
- Human rights in Iran (1925–1979)
  - Human rights in Pahlavi Iran (1925–1979)
  - Human rights in the Islamic Republic of Iran (1979–present)
  - LGBTQ rights in Iran
  - Freedom of religion in Iran
- Law enforcement in Iran

=== Military of Iran ===
Islamic Republic of Iran Armed Forces

- Command
  - Commander-in-chief: Supreme Leader of Iran, Ali Khamenei
    - Ministry of Defence of Iran
- Defense industry of Iran
- Forces (Iran has two armies)
  - Army of Iran
  - Navy of Iran
  - Air Force of Iran
  - Islamic Revolutionary Guard Corps
    - Ground Forces of the Islamic Revolutionary Guard Corps
    - Navy of the Islamic Revolutionary Guard Corps
    - Aerospace Force of the Islamic Revolutionary Guard Corps
    - Quds Force (Special Forces)
  - Basij Resistance Force (paramilitary force. Compare with National Guard)
- Iran and weapons of mass destruction
- Military history of Iran
- Military ranks of Iran

=== Local government in Iran ===
Local government in Iran

- City and Village Councils of Iran

== History of Iran ==
History of Iran

- Timeline of the history of Iran

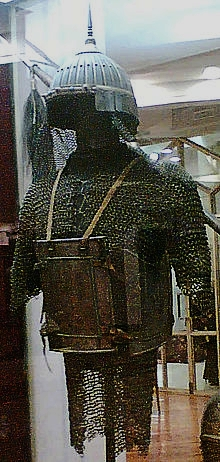
Classic Mirror armour (Persian: چهارآینه)

- Iran hostage crisis
- History of fundamentalist Islam in Iran
- Military history of Iran
  - Iran–Iraq War
- Timeline of the Iranian Revolution
- Mirror armour (Persian: چهارآینه)
- Mail and plate armour

=== History of Iran, by period ===
==== Pre-Islam Iranian history ====
- Palaeolithic Era in Iran
- List of archaeological sites in Iran
- Tepe Sialk
- Jiroft culture
- Kura–Araxes culture
- Atropatene
- Arran (Caucasus)
- Shahr-e Sukhteh
- Akkadian Empire
- Elam
- Mannaea
- Aratta
- Kingdom of Pontus
- Urartu
- Neo-Assyrian Empire
- Neo-Babylonian Empire
- Aratti theory
- Aryan
- Arya (Iran)
- Indo-Iranians
- Iran naming convention
- Kassites
- List of ancient Persians
- List of monarchs of Iran
- Parthia
  - Parthian Empire
  - Arsacid dynasty of Iberia
  - Arsacid dynasty of Armenia
  - Arsacid dynasty of Caucasian Albania
- Persian war elephants
- Median kingdom
- Achaemenid Empire
  - Greco-Persian Wars
- Seleucid Empire
- Parthian Empire
  - Roman–Parthian Wars (part of Roman–Persian wars)
- Sasanian Empire
  - Roman–Persian wars
  - Sasanian Armenia
  - Asorestan

==== Post-Islam Iranian history ====
- Islamization of Iran
- Muslim conquest of Persia
- Anglo-Russian Convention
- Treaty of Gulistan
- Treaty of Akhal
- Treaty of Zuhab
- Treaty of Turkmenchay
- Sallarid dynasty
- Aq Qoyunlu
- Qara Qoyunlu
- Safavid Iran
- Afsharid Iran
- Zand Iran
- Qajar Iran
  - Selected Collection of Qajar Era Maps of Iran
- Ottoman–Persian Wars
- Russo-Persian Wars

==== Pahlavi and contemporary history of Iran ====
- Jungle Movement of Gilan
- List of prime ministers of Iran
- Anglo-Soviet invasion of Iran
- Persian Constitutional Revolution
- Persian Corridor
- White Revolution
- Human rights in Pahlavi Iran (1925–1979)
- Human rights in the Islamic Republic of Iran (1979–present)
- Iran–Iraq War
- United States support for Iraq during the Iran–Iraq War
- International aid to combatants in the Iran–Iraq War
- 1988 executions of Iranian political prisoners
- 2005–06 Ahvaz bombings
- Outline of the 2026 Iran war

=== History of Iran, by subject ===
- History of science in Persia
- Military history of Iran
- Prime Minister of Iran
- Persianization
- Persian mythology
- Greater Iran
- Iranian Azerbaijan
- Iranian Kurdistan
- Iranian peoples
- Iranian studies
- Cultural Revolution in Iran
- University of Chicago's Persian heritage crisis
- Islam in Iran
- Islamization of Iran
- Turco-Persian tradition
- Kayanian dynasty

== Culture of Iran ==
Culture of Iran

- Iranian architecture
- Iranian cuisine
- Ethnicities in Iran
- List of festivals in Iran
- Languages of Iran
- Mass media in Iran
- Museums in Iran
- National symbols of Iran
  - Emblem of Iran
  - Flag of Iran
  - National Anthem of Iran
- People of Iran
- Prostitution in Iran
- Public holidays in Iran
- Religion in Iran
  - Buddhism in Iran
  - Christianity in Iran
  - Hinduism in Iran
  - Islam in Iran
  - History of the Jews in Iran
- List of World Heritage Sites in Iran

=== Art in Iran ===
- Arts of Iran
- Persian art
- Cinema of Iran
- Literature in Iran
- Music of Iran
  - Iranian musical instruments
- Television in Iran
- Iranian theatre

=== Sports in Iran ===
Sports in Iran

- Football in Iran

== Economy and infrastructure of Iran ==
Economy of Iran

- Economic rank, by nominal GDP (2007): 29th
- Agriculture in Iran
- Banking in Iran
  - National Bank of Iran
- Communications in Iran
  - Internet in Iran
- Companies of Iran
- Currency of Iran: Rial
  - ISO 4217: IRR
- Economic history of Iran
- Energy policy of Iran
- Health care in Iran
- Industry of Iran
- Mining in Iran
- Petroleum industry in Iran
- Tehran Stock Exchange
- Tourism in Iran
- Transport in Iran
  - Airports in Iran
  - Rail transport in Iran
  - Roads in Iran
- Urban plans in Iran
- Water supply and sanitation in Iran

== Education in Iran ==
- Education in Iran

== Sanctions against Iran ==
- United States sanctions against Iran
- International sanctions against Iran
- Maximum pressure campaign

== See also ==
Iran

- Index of Iran-related articles
- International rankings of Iran
- List of international rankings
- List of Iran-related topics
- Member state of the United Nations
- Outline of Asia
- Outline of geography
- Nuclear program of Iran
- Ballistic missile program of Iran
- International sanctions against Iran
