= Rock art in Iran =

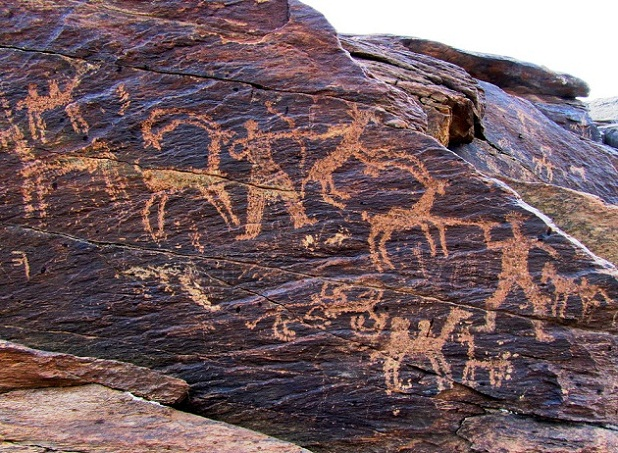
Golpayegan rockart

Rock art in Iran includes archaeological petroglyphs, or carving in rock; pictographs, or painting on rock; and rock reliefs. Large numbers of prehistoric rock art, more than 50,000, have been discovered in Iran.

Dating back to 7000 years before present in Iran, rock art is the oldest surviving artwork. Prehistoric rock art provides insights into past eras and cultures. Archaeologists classify the tools for carving petroglyphs by their historical era. Incising tools include flint, metal, or thigh bones of hunted prey.

The largest rock art panel in Iran, located near Golpayegan spans 12 meters and features more than 100 petroglyphs.

== Chronology ==
The earliest known petroglyphs are in Teimareh or Teymareh (near Golpayegan County) dating back to 7000 years ago. The earliest known pictographs in Iran are in Yafteh cave (near Sorkheh Lizeh in Lorestan Province) and date back 40,000 years. Golpayegan is the central region of Teimareh (Teymareh) petroglyphs. Ancient Iranian pottery and bronze sculpture continue designs found in the rock art. This continuity suggests the impressiveness of petroglyphs of the facades of caves and rocks reflected to ancient Iranian artisans. This continuity can be traced from eighth millennium BC by the potteries in Ganj Dareh (near Qeysvand, Harsin in Kermanshah Province), to the third and first millennium BC, considering the bronze period in Lorestan.

Iran provides exclusive demonstrations of script formation from pictogram, ideogram, linear (2300 BC) or proto-Elamite, geometric old Elamite script, Pahlavi script, Arabic script (906 years ago), Kufi script, and Persian script back to at least 250 years ago.

The most recent chronology of petroglyphs in Iran was done employing the General Antiparticle Spectrometer in 2008 that helped gather data from random samples; though, this is a demanding job that needs a systematic and comprehensive supported effort.

According to the Journal of Orthoptera Research, in 2017–2018, a rock carving of a six-legged mantis named Empusidae hedenborgii with raptorial forearms was revealed in the Teimareh rock art site in the Golpayegan. An engraved, insect-like image has a 14-cm length and 11-cm width with two circles at its sides which probably dates 40,000–4,000 years back. This motif is analogous to the famous 'squatter man' petroglyph encountered at several locations around the world.

== Categories ==
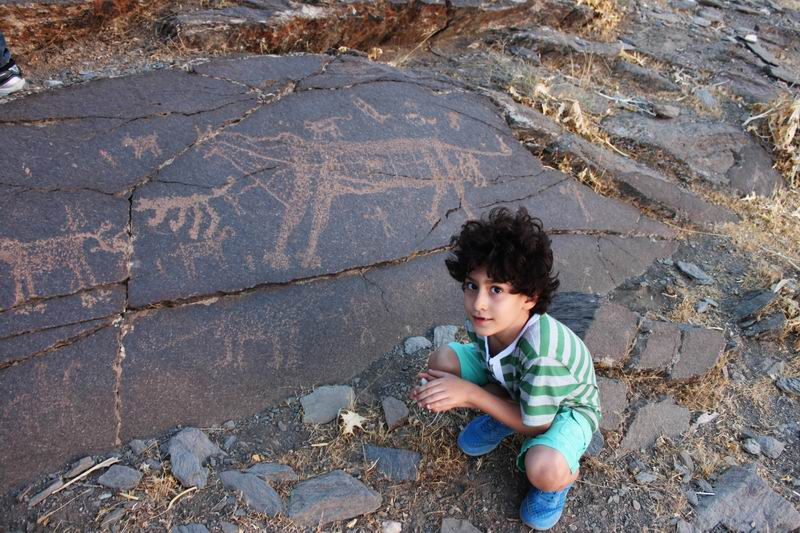
Curious boy sitting near petroglyphs

Pictographs that contain pictures drawn by pigments like smut, crystallized blood, ochre, that were employed by binders like animal fats, blood, seed oil and organic compounds, or a mixture of all materials mentioned above. Lorestan has the most and oldest pictographs in Iran. Yafteh cave in Lorestan has pictographs dating back to 40,000 years ago. Compared to petroglyphs, pictographs in Iran are scarce and rare.

== Subject matter ==
The ibex, a type of goat with prominent, curved horns, is the most common image depicted in rock art. Human figures are portrayed dressed and undressed, performing rituals, roping cattle, walking on foot, riding horses, and hunting.

== Locations ==
Sites that contain pictographs are listed as follows.

1. Lorestan Province: caves like Humian1 and Humian2, Mir Molas around Kuhdasht, Dousheh, and Kalmakareh Cave.
2. Hormozgan Province: deh tall and Ahu cavern in Bastak
3. Kerman Province: Lashkour Gouyeh in Meymand
4. Northern Khorasan Province: Nargeslou cavern around Bojnord

Petroglyphs include most discovered items in Iran, extended on states as follows:

1. East Azerbayejan: Arasbaran.
2. West Azerbayejan : Khoreh Hanjeran around Mahabad.
3. Isfahan: around cities like Golpayegan, Poshtkouh Khonsar, Teeran, Najaf Abad, Damab, Barzok near Kashan, Nashlaj village, Baghbaderan, and Meimeh.
4. Ardebil: sites around Shahriry, Sheikh Mady, and Ghah Ghahe castle in Meshkin Shahr.
5. Tehran: Dowlat Abad village near Shahryar, Kaftar lou mountain.
6. Southern Khorasan: Lakh Mazar of Birjand, Tengel Ostad, Bijaem, and Nehbandan.
7. Northern Khorasan: Nargeslou and Jorbat around Bojnord, and Bam Safi Abad near Esferayen.
8. Khouzestan: Lam Gerdou cavern around Shushtar.
9. Zanjan: Ejdeha cave near Veer village, around Abhar
10. Systan and Baluchestan: [caves around] Saravan, Khash, Nikshahr, Nazil, Ghasre Ghand, and Bazman.
11. Semnan: Chehel Dohktaran E Rashm mountain, near Damghan.

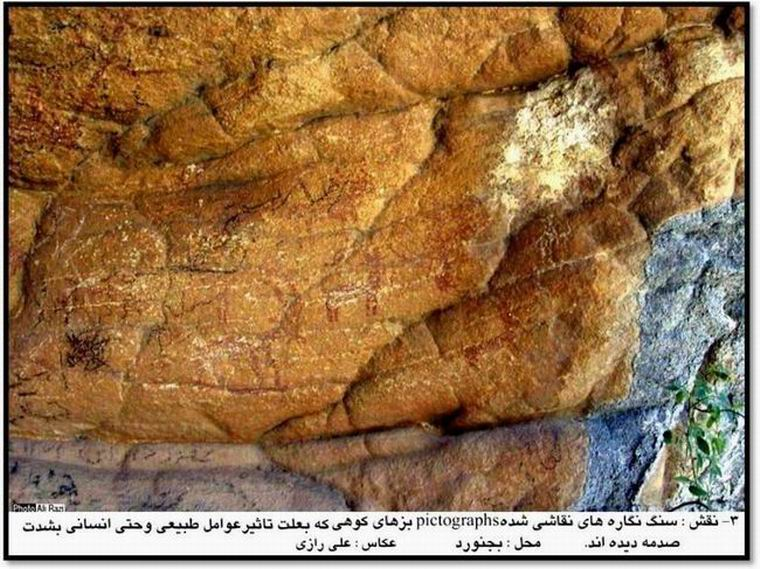
Bojnoord (nargesloo) rock arts in Iran

1. Kerman: Meymand, Shah Firouz near Sirjan, Farash near Jiroft, Sarcheshmeh, and Rafsanjan.
2. Kurdistan: Dehgolan, Saral, Kancharmi near Bijar, Huraman, and Carafto cave.
3. Kermanshah: Sorkhe Liziha, Cheshmeh Sohrab near Meravza, Dinevar, Songhor, and Harseen.
4. Fars: Abadeh, Gheer near Kazeroun.
5. Ghazvin: Chalalmbar, Yazli Ghelich Kendi, Yeri Jan YazGholi, AhgaGhoy, and Bayan Lou near Boein Zahara.
6. Lorestan: Mir Malas and Hamian near Kouhdasht, Khomeh near Aligoudarz, Mihad near Borojerd, Dareh Yal near Azna, Yafteh and Dousheh caves.
7. Mazenderan: Nava summer village around Bala Larijan near Amol.
8. Markazi: Ebrahim Abad near Arak, Ahmad Abad near Khondab, Farsi Jan, Shazand, Susan Abad near Farahan, Poshtgodar near Mahallat, Saroogh, Sarband, Ravanj near Delijan, Yasavol near Komijan, and 31 sites of Timereh near Golpayegan.
9. Hormozgan: Ahu cavern and Deh tall near Bastak
10. Hamedan: Alvand Shahrestaneh Valley, Ganjnameh Valley, Mehrabad Noushijaneh near Malayer, Merianj, Nahavand, Ordoshahan Mountains
11. Yazd: Tabas Nahrin valley, Ernan mountain, Hikhteh mountain, Sorkh Dodoushan mountain, Nasrabad village near Taft, Showaz, Ganj valley

== Subject matter ==
The following table offers the first classification of petroglyphs according to redundancy and frequency.

The theme occurrence of petroglyphs by random sampling (percentage)
%	Subject Matter	Number
88%	Ibex, symbolically depicted by a long curved horn that extends to tail	1
3%	Human figures	2
2%	Cupmarks, codes, scripts	3
2%	Wild or domestic horses	4
1%	Camels with one or two humps. Birds.	5
1%	Felines, canines, mice, pigs, and similar animals	6
1%	Deer (Maral, Shooka) and antelopes	7
1%	Extinct/unrecognizable animals	8
0.5%	Geometric marks	9
0.5%	plants	10

== See also ==
- Prehistory of Iran
