= Sefid-Ab =

Archeological site in Iran

Sefid-Ab is an archeological site in central Iran and is the first known evidence for Upper Paleolithic occupation of that region.

The site is associated with an old spring which was an important water source for Upper Paleolithic people in the arid region of Kashan during the late Pleistocene. Collected stone tools are characteristic of Baradostian and display similarities to Upper Paleolithic industries of the Zagros region.

== See also ==
- Palaeolithic Era in Iran

== Sources ==
Biglari, F. (2004) The Preliminary Survey of Paleolithic Sites in the Kashan region., In S.M. Shahmirzadi (ed.), The Silversmiths of Sialk (Sialk Reconsideration Project), Report No. 2: 151–168. Archaeological Research Center. Iranian Cultural Heritage Organization, Tehran. (In Persian)

Shidrang, S. and F. Biglari (2005) Sefid-Ab: New Evidence of Upper Paleolithic Occupation at the Iranian Central Plateau. 2005 ASOR Annual Meeting Abstract Book, pp. 23–24, Philadelphia.

Shidrang, S 2009 A Typo-technological Study of an Upper Paleolithic Collection from Sefid-Ab, Central Iran, In: M. Otte, F. Biglari, and J. Jaubert (eds), Iran Palaeolithic. pp. 47–56, Proceedings of the XV World Congress UISPP, Lisbonne, Vol. 28, BAR International Series 1968

- https://web.archive.org/web/20070928003216/http://www.asor.org/AM/abstracts05.pdf
