= Kashafrud River =

River in Razavi Khorasan province, Iran

Coordinates: 35.9649°N 61.1190°E

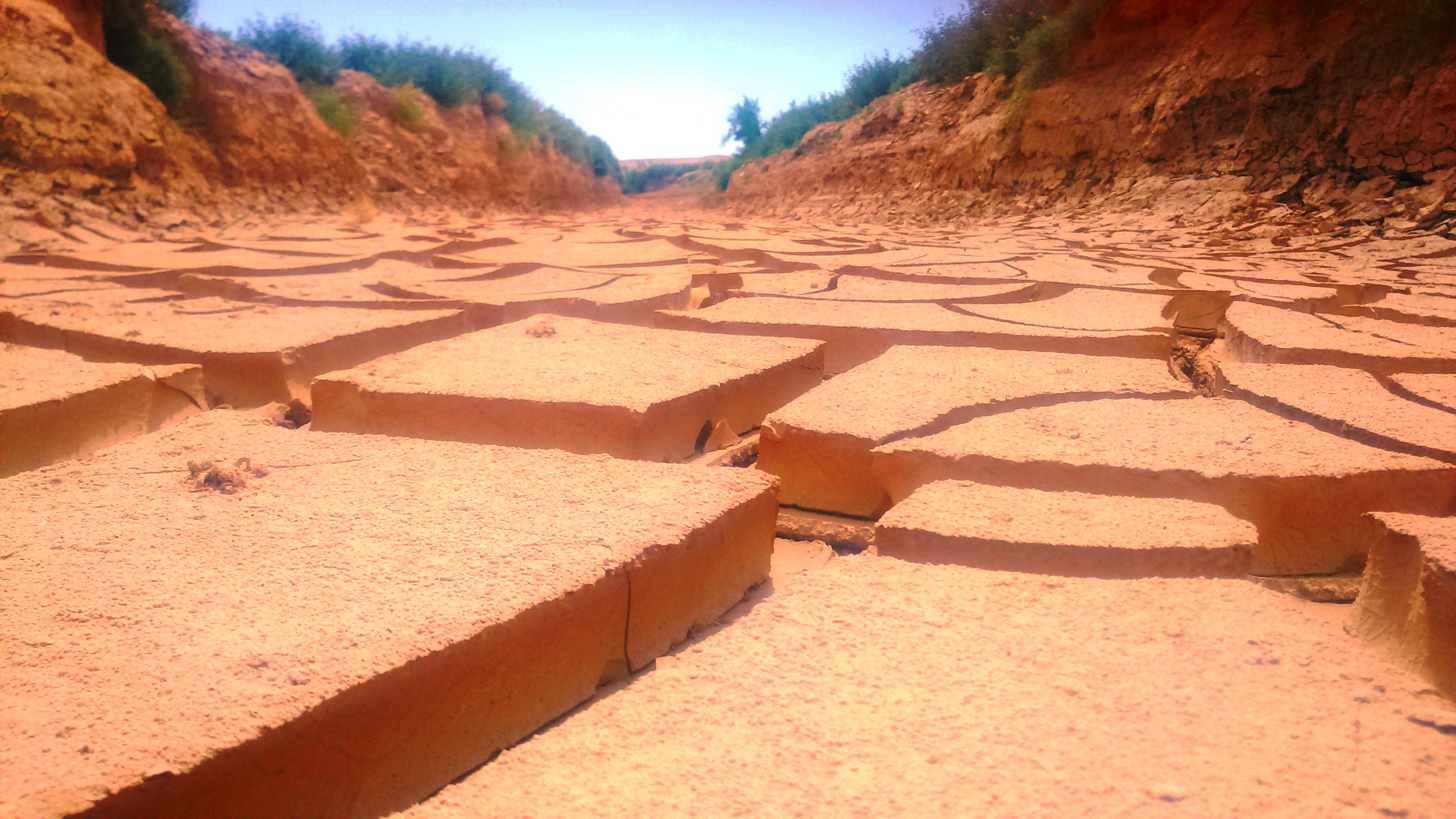
Kashafrud River

The Kashafrud (Persian: کشف‌رود), also Kashafrud River, originates in the Hezar Masjed Mountains in Razavi Khorasan province, northeastern Iran. After passing from the vicinity of the cities of Radkan and Chenaran in Razavi Khorasan and then passing north and east of the city of Mashhad, the Kashfrud joins the Harirud River at the frontier of Iran and Turkmenistan.

== Geography ==
The Kashafrud is 240 kilometres or 150 miles long and originates from the mountain ranges of Hezar Masjed and Binalood.

The main town on the river is the city of Mashhad. The town of Tus is also on the river.

The river is used for irrigation, and its valley has been known since the Middle Ages for its fertility.

== History ==
Alexander the Great passed through the valley of the Kashaf River. The Arabs entered the valley in 650 AD. Sultan Abu Said built a dam on the river. The geographer Al-Tusi was from the Kashafrud valley. The army of Genghis Khan attacked the region of the Kashafrud in 1220 AD.

=== Kashafrud Basin ===
Kashafrud Basin is an archaeological site in Iran, known for the Lower Palaeolithic artifacts collected there; these are the oldest-known evidence for human occupation of Iran. On the basis of their geological contexts, this collection is more than 800,000 years old. Thus, Kashfarud is one of the oldest human settlements in Iran. A number of stone tools discovered by Kashafrud are displayed in the Paleolithic Hall of the National Museum of Iran.
