= Mount Meywala =

Mountain in western Iran with archaeological caves

Maiwala
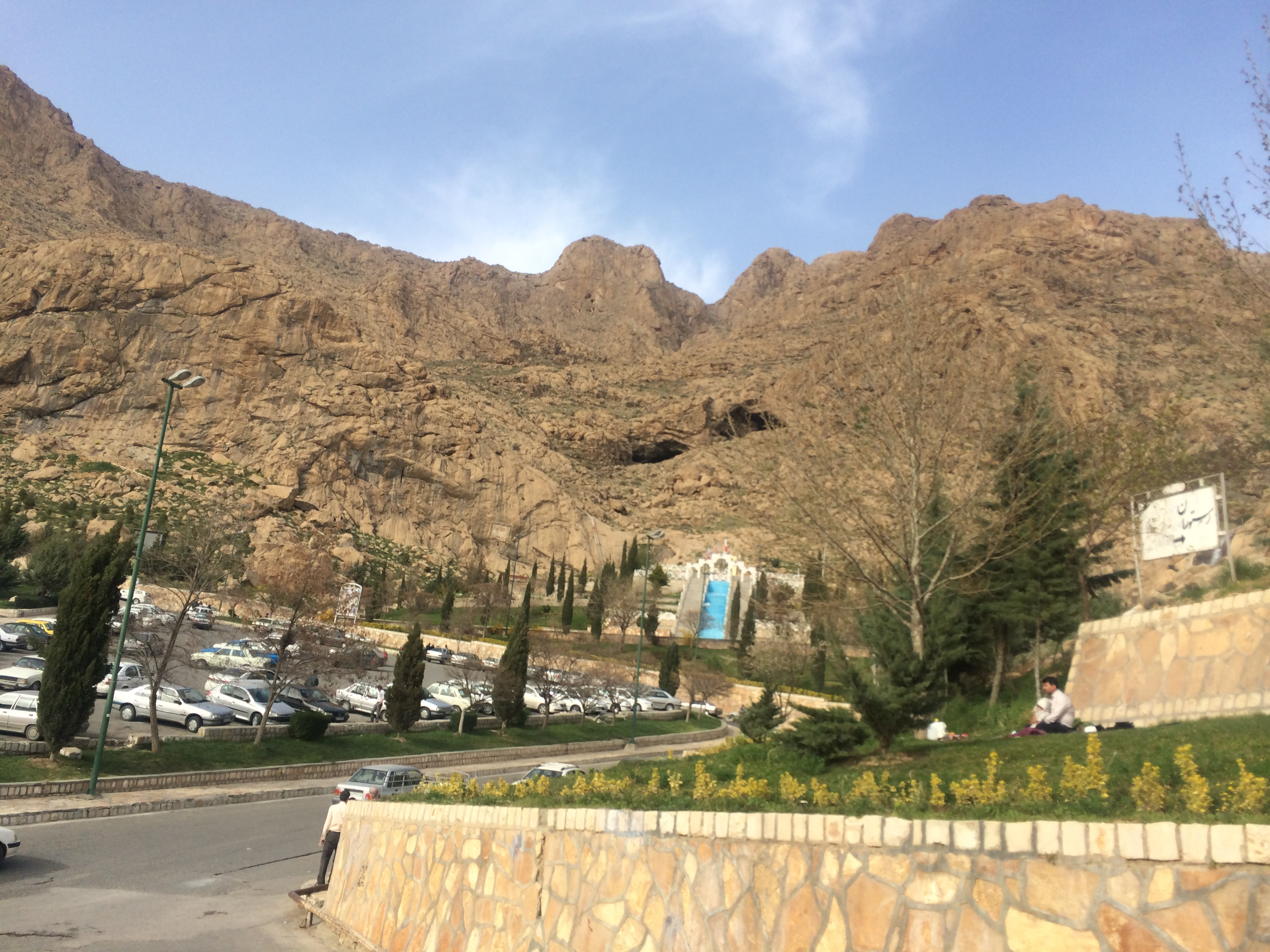
- Meywala

Highest point
- Elevation: 2,100 m (6,900 ft)
- Coordinates: 34.4010°N 47.1277°E

Geography
- Location within Iran
- Location: Kermanshah, Iran
- Parent range: Zagros Mountains

Maiwala (Persian: میوله, Kurdish:میوله) or Farokhshad (Persian: فرخشاد) is a mountain of the Zagros Mountains, located in western Iran, north of the city of Kermanshah. It is one of the mountains of Paraw range, with an altitude of 2445 above sea level. It is about 5 km long from the Tang-e Malavard at west to Taq-e Kenesht at east. The mountain contains several archaeological caves.

== Archaeology ==
Archaeologists have discovered artifacts of the Paleolithic and historical periods on the southern slopes of the mountain. Three caves were occupied by Neanderthals during the Middle Paleolithic Period including Do-Ashkaft Cave, Malaverd, and Dasht-e Kahou. Archaeological excavations have shown that about forty thousand years ago, Neanderthal humans used natural outcrops of radiolarite or chert around this plain to make stone tools.

== Climbing routes ==
There are several routes to climb up to the peak.
