= Malaverd =

Archaeological site in Iran

- Malawerd
- Tang-e malaverd
- Location in Iran
- 34°24′24.72″N 47°5′30.76″E
- Type: cave
- Periods: Middle Paleolithic, Upper Paleolithic, Chalcolithic, Iron Age III, Parthian
- Cultures: Mousterian, Baradostian
- Associated with: Neanderthal
- Location: Kermanshah Province, Iran
- Region: Kermanshah

History
- Built: ca. 60,000 BP
- Abandoned: ca. 2,000 BP

Site notes
- Elevation: 1,460 m (4,790 ft)
- Length: 16 m (52 ft)
- Width: 18 m (59 ft)
- Excavation dates: 2012
- Archaeologists: Sonia Shidrang
- Condition: Registered in the Iran National Heritage List, 12019
- Owner: Ministry of Cultural Heritage, Tourism and Handicrafts, Iran

Malaverd is an archaeological site in the north of Kermanshah, in Iran. It is located in the Tang-e Malaverd valley, at the western end of Mount Meywala, about 8 km (26,247 ft) from the west of Taq-e Bostan. Malaverd is one of multiple Paleolithic cave sites in the south of Mount Meywala.

== Discovery ==
The site was recorded during a survey conducted be Fereidoun Biglari in 1999 and registered in the Iran National Heritage List in 2005.

== Excavation ==
The site was excavated by a team of archaeologists under the direction of Sonia Shidrang in August 2012. The site contained a 170 cm thick sequence of archaeological deposits. The excavations revealed that the cave was occupied during the Middle Paleolithic (c. 60,000 to 40,000 years ago), Upper Paleolithic (c. 35,000 to 28,000 years ago), Chalcolithic, Iron Age III, and Parthian.

The cave is the first Upper Paleolithic site in the Kermanshah region that was excavated by an Iranian archaeologist and the first dated Upper Paleolithic site in the region.

== See also ==
- Do-Ashkaft Cave - Another important cave site near Malaverd
