= Zarzian culture =

Archaeological culture

- Geographical range: Zagros Mountains
- Period: Mesolithic
- Dates: c. 18,000 BC – c. 8,000 BC
- Preceded by: Baradostian culture
- Followed by: M'lefaatian culture, Elshanka culture

Zarzian culture is an archaeological culture of late Paleolithic and Mesolithic in Southwest Asia.

The period of the culture is estimated to have existed about 18,000–8,000 BCE. It was preceded by the Baradostian culture in the same region and was related to the Imeretian culture of the Caucasus.

The culture was named and recognised of the cave of Zarzi in Iraqi Kurdistan.

Here were found plenty of microliths (up to 20% finds). Their forms are short and asymmetric trapezoids, and triangles with hollows.

Andy Burns states "The Zarzian of the Zagros region of Iran is contemporary with the Natufian but different from it. The only dates for the entire Zarzian come from Palegawra Cave, and date to 17,300-17,000BP, but it is clear that it is broadly contemporary with the Levantine Kebaran, with which it shares features. It seems to have evolved from the Upper Palaeolithic Baradostian."

There are only a few Zarzian sites and the area appears to have been quite sparsely populated during the Epipalaeolithic. Faunal remains from the Zarzian indicate that the temporary form of structures indicate a hunter-gatherer subsistence strategy, focused on onager, red deer and caprines. Better known sites include Palegawra Cave, Shanidar B2 and Zarzi." The Zarzian culture seems to have participated in the early stages of what Kent Flannery has called the broad spectrum revolution. The Zarzian culture is found associated with remains of the domesticated dog and with the introduction of the bow and arrow. It seems to have extended north into the Gobustan (Kobystan, Qobustan) region and into Eastern Iran as a forerunner of the Hissar and related cultures.

== See also ==
- Epipaleolithic
- Prehistory of Iran
- History of Mesopotamia
- Trialetian culture
- Natufian culture
- Khiamian
