= Hezar Masjed Mountains =

Mountain range in Iran

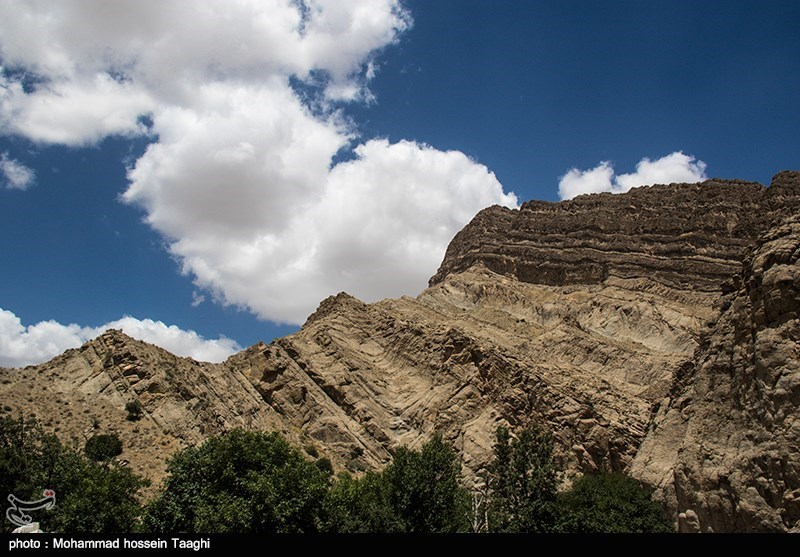
- Hezar Masjed Mountains

Highest point
- Coordinates: 36°58′N 59°22′E

Naming
- Native name: رشته‌کوه هزارمسجد (Persian)

Geography
- Location within Iran

Hezar Masjed Mountains (Persian: رشته‌کوه هزارمسجد, lit. 'Thousand Mosques Mountain Range') are a group of mountains that form the southeastern section of the Kopet Dag Range. Located about 20 kilometres east of Dargaz and 70 kilometres north of Mashhad in Razavi Khorasan province in Iran and stretched in a northwest–southeast direction (from northwest to northeast of Mashhad), the mountains are situated almost at the extreme northeastern part of Iran.

== Etymology ==
In Persian, "Hezar Masjed" could be considered as two words: "hezar" meaning "thousand" and "masjed" meaning "mosque".

== Geology ==
Geologically the mountains were formed mainly in the Miocene and Pliocene and are chiefly made of Jurassic limestone rocks. The north and northwestern sections of the mountains are mainly made of Lower Cretaceous limestones.
