= Sorkheh Lizeh =

Sorkheh Lizeh سرخه ليزه
- Village
- Location within Iran
- Coordinates: 33°29′50″N 48°12′23″E
- Country: Iran
- Province: Lorestan
- County: Khorramabad
- Bakhsh: Central
- Rural District: Koregah-e Gharbi

Population (2006)
  - Total: 360
- Time zone: UTC+3:30 (IRST)
  - Summer (DST): UTC+4:30 (IRDT)

Sorkheh Lizeh (Persian: سرخه ليزه, also Romanized as Sorkheh Līzeh; also known as Sorkheh Līzeh Meleh Shābānān, Sorkheh Neyzār, Sorkheh Yazar, and Sorkheh Yezār) is a village in Koregah-e Gharbi Rural District, in the Central District of Khorramabad County, Lorestan Province, Iran. At the 2006 census, its population was 360, in 63 families.
