= Dasht-e Kahou =

Coordinates: 34°23′54″N 47°8′43″E

Dasht-e Kâhou (Persian:دشت کاهو means Lettuce Plain; Kurdish: گیادورن means vegetation harvest) is a mountaintop plain above Taq-e Bostan Mount located in north of Kermanshah city in west of Iran. The plain is a flat area at the top of Taq-e Bostan Mount, which covers an area of about 11 hectares and is about 1840 meters above sea level. Its length in the north–south axis is about 400 meters and in the east–west axis is about 550 meters. Do-kal Peak is located in the northwest of this plain and Taq-e Bostan Peak is located in its southwest. The plain is surrounded by rocky outcrops and its floor consists of fine-grained sediments in bright red color (Terra rossa (soil)). During spring and early summer it covered by varied and rich vegetation. Some plant species of the plain include thyme (sagebrush), safflower (oregano), yarrow and some species of sage and chicory. Archaeological excavations have shown that about forty thousand years ago, Neanderthal humans used natural outcrops of radiolarite or chert around this plain to make stone tools. Due to the development of karst in Taq-e-Bostan mountain, this plain has an important role in supplying water to Taq-e-Bostan spring. Water from snow melt and rain passes through karst channels under the plain into the mountain's calcareous system and comes out as the Taq-e Bostan spring. Implementing a gondola lift project on this plain is planned by municipality of Kermanshah. According to experts, the construction of this station, in addition to severe damage to the prehistoric open-air site, will destroy the unique vegetation and contaminate the karst aquifer of Taq-e Bostan and Do-Ashkaft springs.
