= Ganj Par =

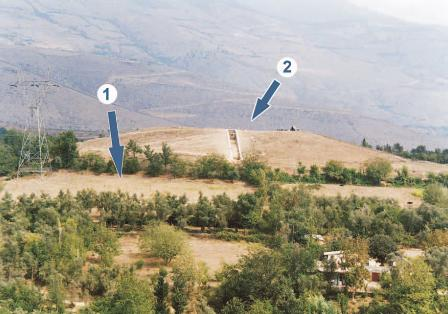

Ganj Par (Persian: گنج پر) is a Lower Paleolithic site located in the Gilan province in northern Iran.

Located on an old western terrace of the Sefīd-Rūd River, the site was discovered by a team of archaeologists from the Center for Paleolithic Research of the National Museum of Iran in 2002. The Lower Paleolithic cave site of Darband Cave is located east of Ganj Par.

== Artefacts ==
About 150 stone artifacts —handaxes, cleavers, a pick, choppers, and smaller flake tools — made of limestone, igneous rocks, and sandstone have been found at the site. There are some similarities between these Acheulian stone tools with those found in Caucasus region. The Discovery of Ganj Par thus indicates that Iran is part of the Acheulian territory.
