= Shiwatoo =

Archaeological site in Iran

- شیوه‌تو (Sorani Kurdish)
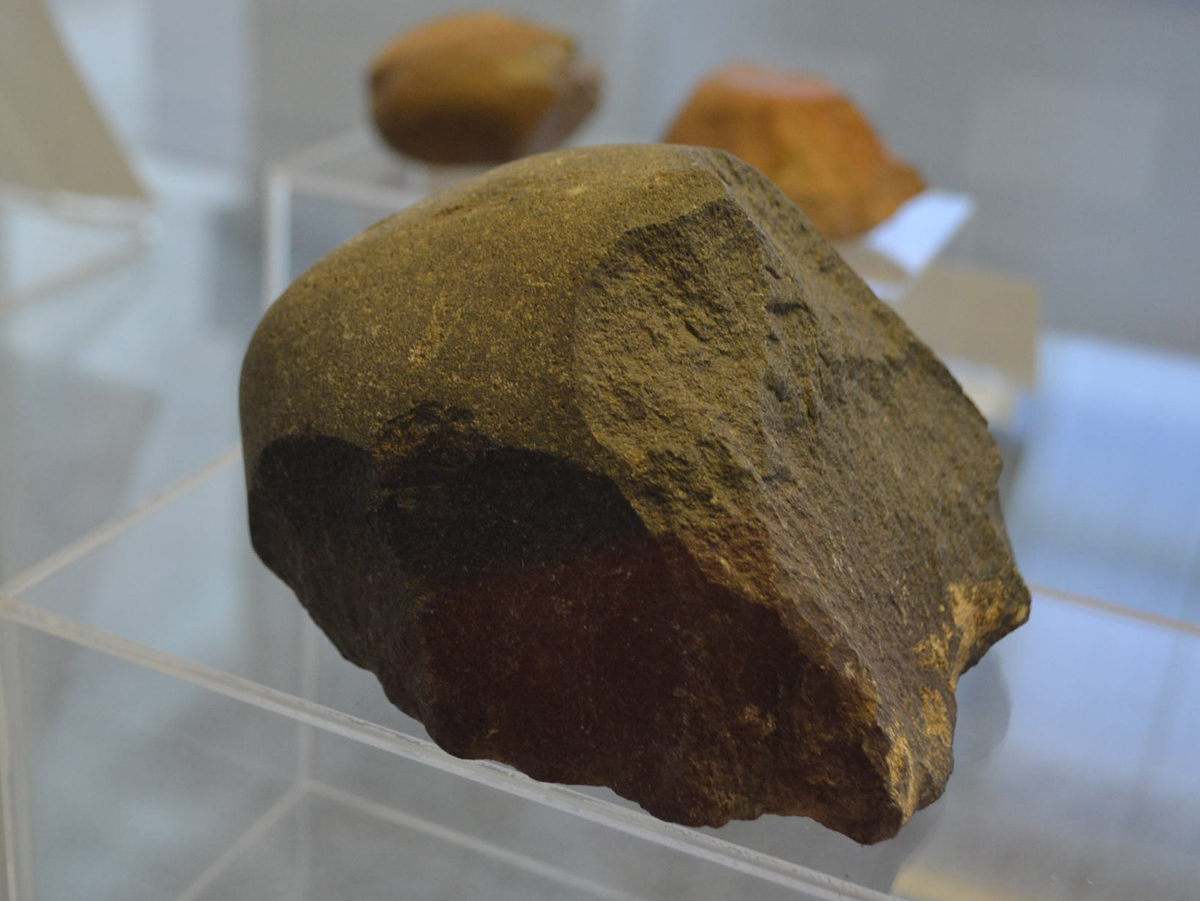
- Shiwatoo Cleaver stone, National Museum of Iran
- Type: Open-air site
- Periods: Pleistocene
- Cultures: Acheulean
- Location: Iran
- Region: Mahabad

Site notes
- Public access: 7 km to the west of Mahabad, overlooking Mahabad-Piranshahr road

Shiwatoo (Sorani Kurdish: شیوه‌تو), located 7 km to the west of Mahabad, overlooking Mahabad-Piranshahr road in the West Azarbaijan Province, Iran, is an archaeological site of the Lower Paleolithic, c. 400.000 years ago.

== Artifacts ==
Archaeologists collected nearly one hundred artifacts from an area measuring about one hectare (2.5 acres) overlooking the Mahabad River. Many of the artifacts were made from andesite, quartzite, and basalt cobbles.

The stone industry consists primarily of cores, tested cobbles, and core-choppers. The most characteristic find from this site is a Cleaver (tool), which is a type of biface stone tool of Acheulean tradition of the Lower Palaeolithic.
