= Qeysevand, Kermanshah =

Ghaisvand قيسوند
- Village
- Location within Iran
- Coordinates: 34°43′31″N 46°54′31″E
- Country: Iran
- Province: Kermanshah
- County: Kermanshah
- Bakhsh: Central
- Rural District: Razavar

Population (2006)
  - Total: 532
- Time zone: UTC+3:30 (IRST)
  - Summer (DST): UTC+4:30 (IRDT)

Qeysevand (Persian: قيسوند; also known as Qeysehvand) is a village in Razavar Rural District, in the Central District of Kermanshah County, Kermanshah Province, Iran. At the 2006 census, its population was 532, in 116 families.
