= Baradostian culture =

Upper Paleolithic flint industry culture

- Period: Upper Paleolithic
- Dates: c. 36,000 – c. 18,000 BC
- Preceded by: Mousterian
- Followed by: Zarzian culture, Trialetian

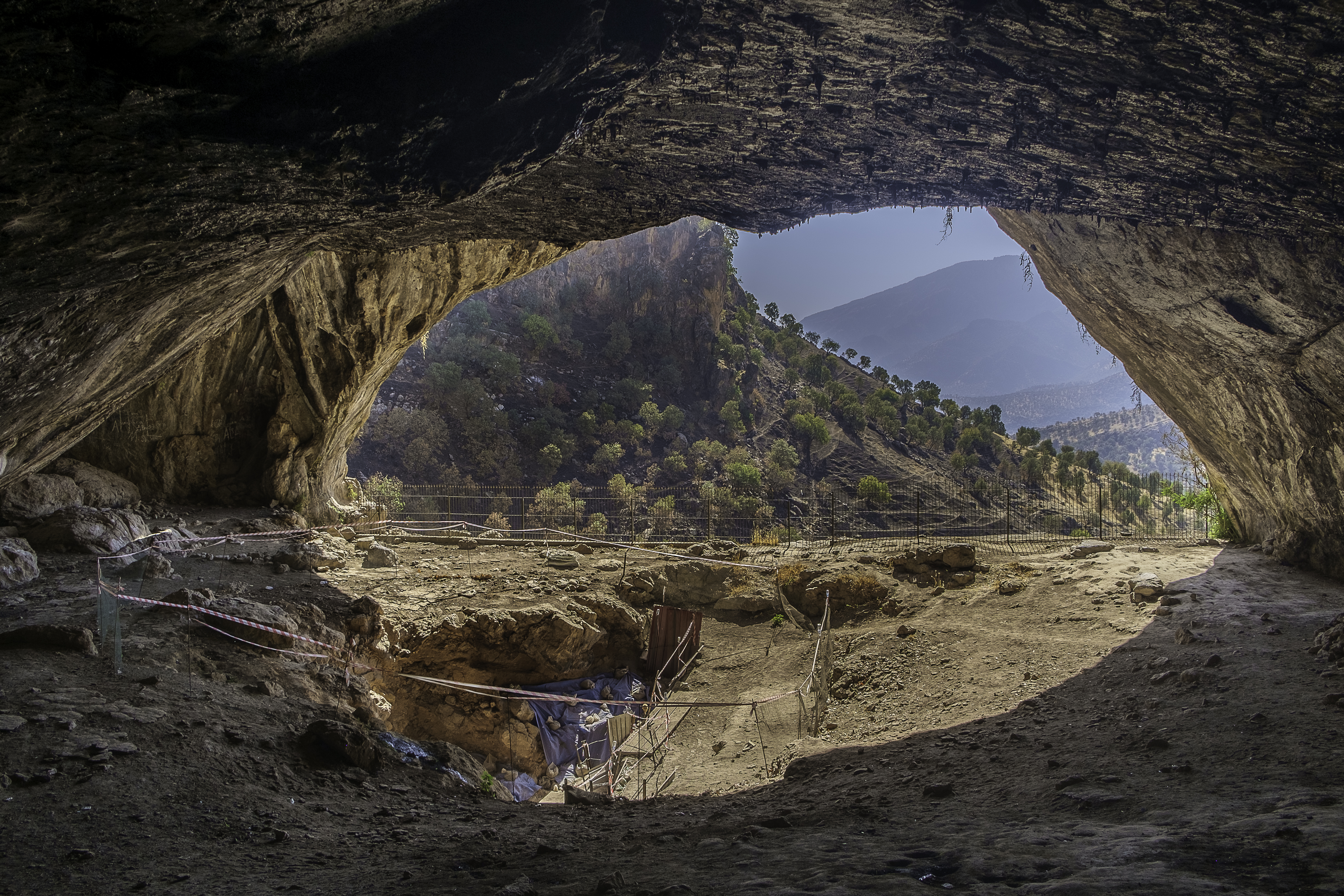
Shanidar Cave, an important site associated with the Baradostian culture in the Zagros region

The Baradostian culture was an Upper Paleolithic flint industry culture found in the Zagros region in the border-country between Iraq and Iran. It was preceded by the Middle Paleolithic Mousterian culture, directly overlying it without an intervening bladelet industry.

According to M. Otte, the Baradostian culture is part of the Aurignacian traditions. This culture is known for the high percentage of burins and some of these are similar to the distinctive nosed profile of the Aurignacian burins.

The Yafteh cave and five other Baradostian caves are protected as a World Heritage Site under the name The Prehistoric Sites of the Khorramabad Valley.

== Characteristics ==
Radiocarbon dates suggest that this was one of the earliest Upper Paleolithic complexes, beginning perhaps as early as 36,000 BC. Evidence found in the Yafteh cave assemblages revealed that the early phase of this culture was not as sophisticated as the evolved middle phase, and it produced blades and bladelets using soft hammer from single platform prismatic cores with plain platforms.

The Baradostian's relationship to neighbouring cultures remains unclear. This is also the case regarding the issue of whether this culture gradually evolved from the previous Zagros Mousterian cultural group, which is associated primarily with the Neanderthals, or whether early modern humans brought to the Zagros region the technologies linked to the Baradostian.

Shanidar Cave in Iraqi Kurdistan, Warwasi rock-shelter, Kaldar Cave and Yafteh Cave in the western Zagros, and Eshkaft-e Gavi Cave in the southern Zagros was among the major sites to have been excavated. Perhaps precipitated by the most recent cold phase (the Würm glaciation) of the current ice age, the Baradostian was replaced by a local Epipaleolithic industry called the Zarzian culture. The Baradostian tool tradition marks the end of the Zagros Paleolithic sequence.
