= Yafteh =

Cave and archaeological site in Iran

- location in Iran
- 33°34′1.3″N 48°16′26.1″E
- Location: northwest of Khoramabad
- Region: Iran

UNESCO World Heritage Site
- Part of: The Prehistoric Sites of the Khorramabad Valley
- Criteria: Cultural: iii
- Reference: 1744-004
- Inscription: 2025 (47th Session)

Yafteh (Persian: یافته) is a cave located at the foot of Yafteh Mountain in the western part of the Zagros Mountains range, northwest of Khoramabad, Lorestan Province (Western Iran). It is known for its Upper Paleolithic artefacts assigned to the Baradostian culture. It is part of the World Heritage site The Prehistoric Sites of the Khorramabad Valley (along with five other caves).

== Description ==
Yafteh has yielded the largest number of C14 dates from a single Paleolithic site in Iran that are clustered around 28–35 thousand years ago. A rich collection of ornaments made of marine shells, tooth and hematite has been discovered in the early Upper Paleolithic deposits in both early and recent excavations in the Yafteh cave. This collection was analyzed and published by Sonia Shidrang in the Iranian Journal of Archaeology and History.

== Archaeological history ==
The site was found and later excavated by two American archaeologists, Frank Hole and Kent Flannery, in the 1960s. It contained a thick Upper Paleolithic sequence which yielded bladelets and tools. A number of C14 dates indicate that the site was occupied mainly between 30 and 35 thousand years ago. Hole and Flannery published some results of their excavation at Yafteh in a general paper about their excavations in prehistoric sites in Loristan and Dehluran.

The lithic assemblages from 1967 excavations were re-analyzed in 2005 by Bordes and Shidrang and later those assemblages were the main subject of a MA thesis in 2007.

The site was re-excavated in 2005 by a joint Belgian-Iranian team directed by Marcel Otte and Fereidoun Biglari and excavated again by Otte and Sonia Shidrang in 2008.

== See also ==
- Baradostian culture
- Archaeological sites in Iran
- Prehistoric Iran
