= Qal'eh Bozi =

Cave and archaeological site in Iran

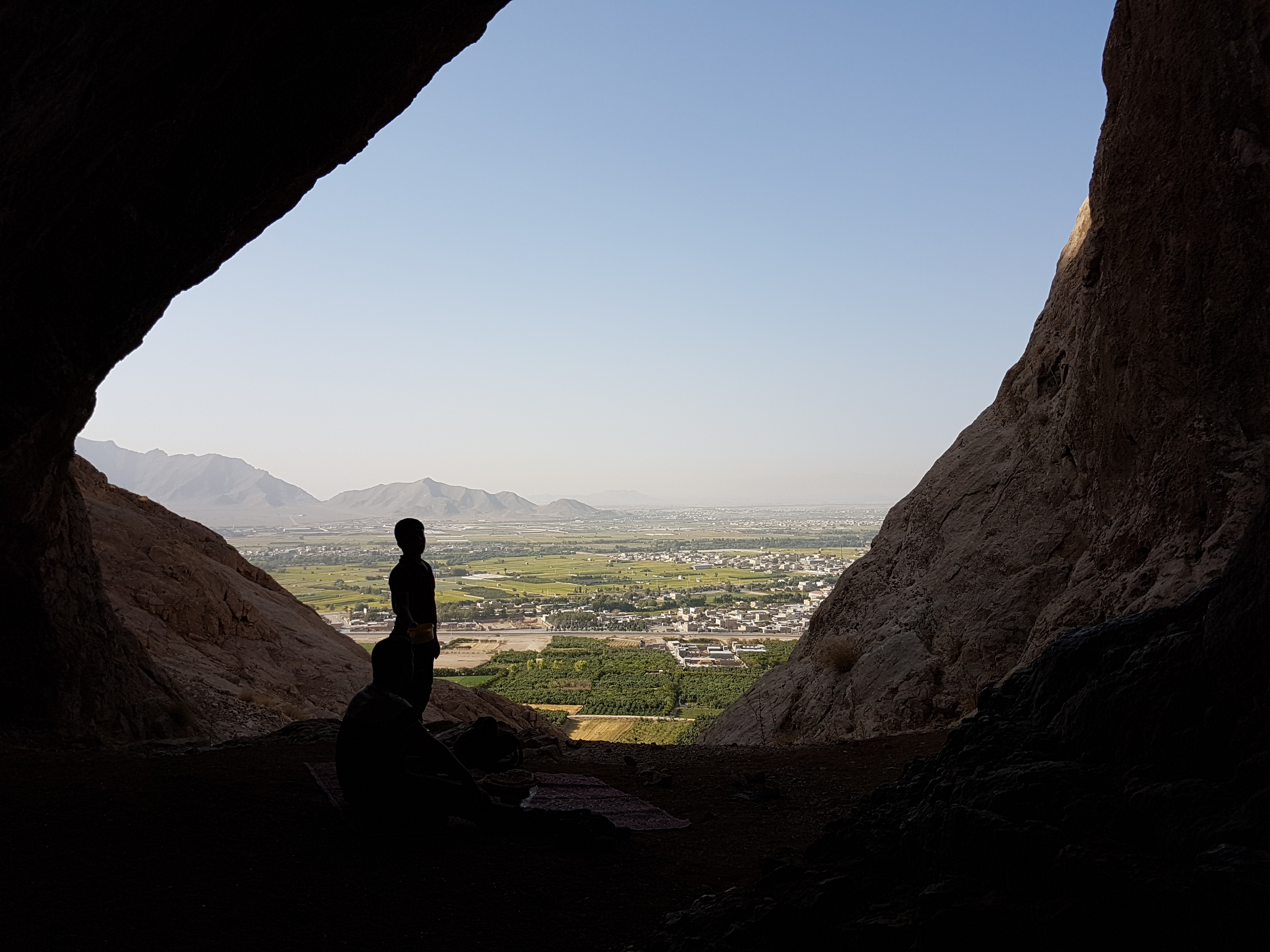

- location in Iran
- 32°23′20″N 51°33′41″E
- Location: Southwest of Isfahan
- Region: Iran

Qal'eh Bozi (Persian: قلعه بزی) is a complex of caves and rock shelters sites located about 25 km (15.5 mi) southwest of Isfahan, Iran; northeast of Dizicheh and north of Hassanabad. The site includes two rock shelters and a cave located at altitudes between 1,750 and 1,810 m (5,741.5 and 5,938.3 ft) above sea level. The caves are found on the southern face of a limestone mountain of lower Cretaceous age that rises to more than 500 m (1,640.4 ft) above the plain floor. From the cave entrance there is a commanding view of the plain below and of the Zaiandeh Rud River flowing about 2 km (1.2 mi) to the south and southeast.

Following the cave site's discovery three seasons of archaeological excavation have been undertaken there, the most recent in 2008. They discovered that the Qaleh Bozi caves attracted human groups due to proximity to freshwater in the form of a permanent river, good solar exposure in cold seasons, and the variety of landscape types (such as cliffs, slopes and plains), which promoted diversity of hunting game and plants.
