= Bisitun Cave =

Cave and archaeological site in Iran

- location in Iran
- 34°23′26″N 47°26′13″E
- Periods: Middle Paleolithic
- Cultures: Mousterian
- Location: Kermanshah province
- Region: Iran

Bisitun Cave (also called "Hunter's cave", Bisotun [Farsi], Bisetoun [Kurdish], Bisitoun, or Behistoun) is an archaeological site of prehistoric human habitation in the Zagros Mountains in the Kermanshah province, north-west Iran. Bisitun Cave is one of five caves situated at the base of The Rock of Bisitun, a 1,300 m (4,300 ft) high cliff within the Chamchamal Plain. It was first excavated in 1949 by Carlton Coon, and is notable for the discovery of Mousterian stone tools of the Middle Paleolithic, as well as the remains of 109 identifiable species of Pleistocene mammals, and hominid remains. Harold Dibble described the stone tools as having strong Levallois components. All artefacts are apparently from the same period.

It has not been possible to discern a geological age of the Middle Paleolithic levels at Bisitun Cave. However, the relative abundance of Cervus in the deposits suggests a nearby woodland, and such vegetation is indicative of a warmer later Pleistocene phase. In Southwestern Asia in general, the Middle Paleolithic falls between the Later Middle Pleistocene (Marine Isotope Stage 6/7) and the middle of the Last Glacial (mid Marine Isotope Stage-3). Therefore the age of Bisitun Cave is likely to fall within this period also.

== Hominin remains ==
Coon described two hominid remains from the site, a maxilliary upper incisor and a radius shaft fragment, both from a layer designated F+. These remains were listed but never described fully for the palaeontological community. When they were finally re-examined four decades later, the incisor was found to be bovid in origin, rather than hominin. The radius fragment was found to show Neanderthal affinities, as it is mediolaterally expanded at the interosseus crest.

== See also ==
- List of caves in Iran
- Shanidar Cave
