= Do-Ashkaft Cave =

Cave and archaeological site in Iran

Do-Ashkaft cave
- location in Iran
- 34°24′3.4″N 47°7′50″E
- Type: Cave
- Periods: Middle Paleolithic
- Associated with: Neanderthals
- Location: north of Kermanshah, western Iran
- Region: Kermanshah Province, Iran
- Part of: Kermanshah Plain

Site notes
- Material: limestone
- Excavation dates: 1996
- Archaeologists: F. Biglari, S. Heydari

Do-Ashkaft Cave (Persian: غار دواشکفت) being a Middle Paleolithic cave site, is located north of Kermanshah, near Taq-e Bostan, Iran about 1,600 m (5,200 ft) above sea level. Its entrance faces south of Meywala Mount, overlooking the national park of Kuhestan. The site was first visited in 1996 by Iranian researchers F. Biglari and S. Heydari-Guran and during the following four years a series of surface surveys were made at one-month intervals, which resulted in a rich collection of Middle Paleolithic lithic artifacts.

The main chamber of the cave is 23 m (75 ft) deep and 15 m (49 ft) wide. Large areas of breccia sediments indicate lateral percolation of water into the cave sediments as a substantial amount of the cave sediments may have been washed away. The sediments at the entrance yielded numerous animal bones, charcoal and flint tools, Middle Paleolithic artifacts, such as side-scrapers and a Mousterian point. Animal bones show signs of human involvement in their accumulation during the Mousterian occupation. They include a fragment of a right mandible of an adult specimen and an upper third right molar of a sub-adult ruminant, both allocated to wild Caprinae.

In 1999, an area of about 7 km^{2} (2.7 sq mi) including 14 caves and rock-shelters was surveyed, where Upper Palaeolithic and later lithic assemblages came to light. Records and samples made by S. Heydari provide a paleo-environmental sequence for the region from the late Middle Pleistocene to the Holocene. The Neanderthal occupants of the cave made tools from local raw material outcrops around the cave, which classify as to be Mousterian.

== Bibliography ==
1. Fereidoun Biglari and Saman Heydari (2001) Do-Ashkaft: a recently discovered Mousterian cave site in the Kermanshah Plain, Iran, Antiquity, Vol 75, No: 289, Page: 487–488
2. Biglari, F.(2007) Approvisionnement et utilisation des matières premières au Paléolithique moyen dans la plaine de Kermanshah Iran) : le cas de la Grotte Do-Ashkaft, M. H. Moncel, A. Moigne, M. Arzarello, C. Peretto (eds), Aires 'approvisionnement en matières premières et aires d'approvisionnement en resources alimentaires Approche intégrée des comportements, Workshop 23, XV Congrès UISPP, Lisbonne, Vol. 5, BAR International Series 172

== Gallery ==
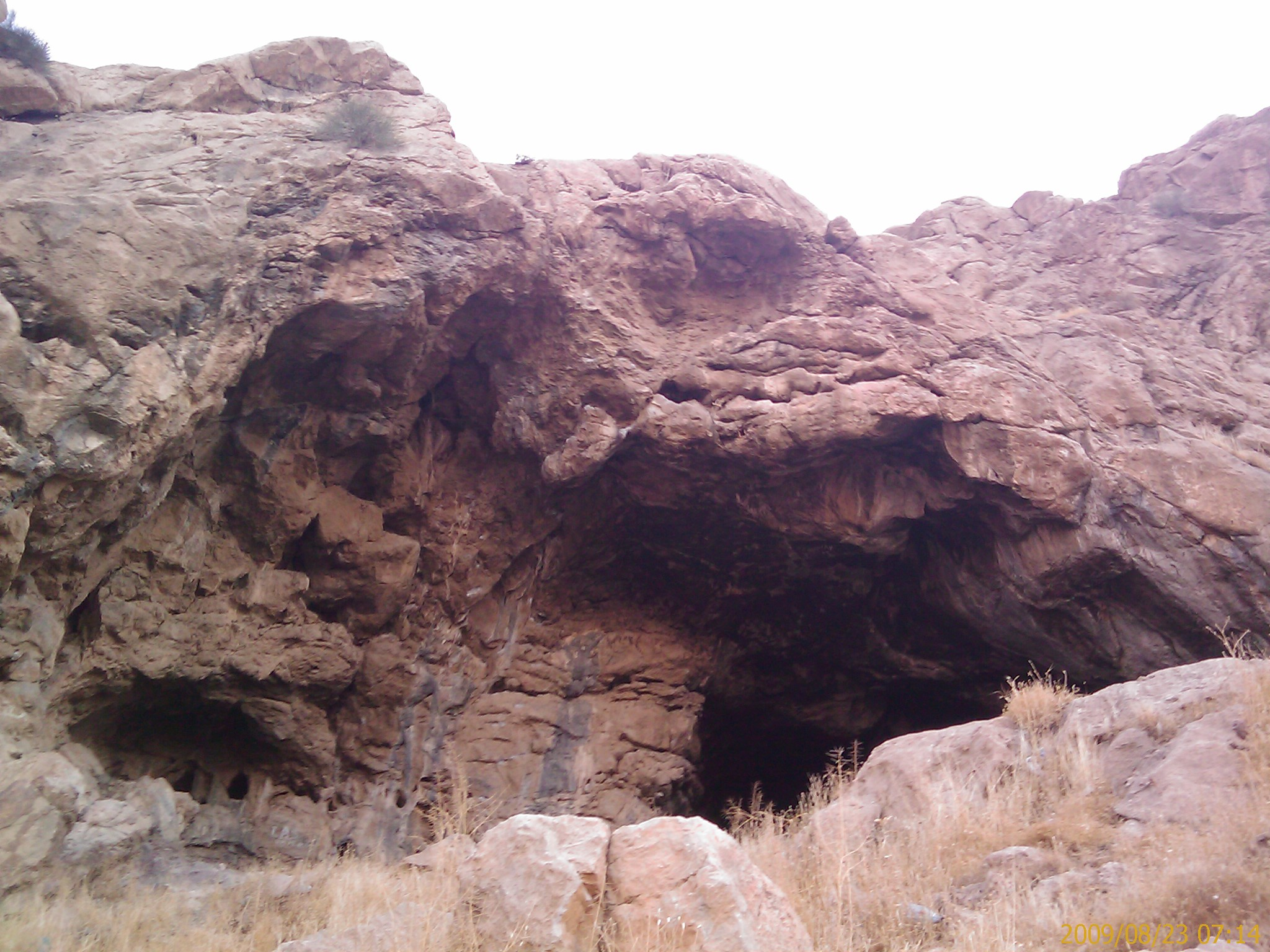
big cave

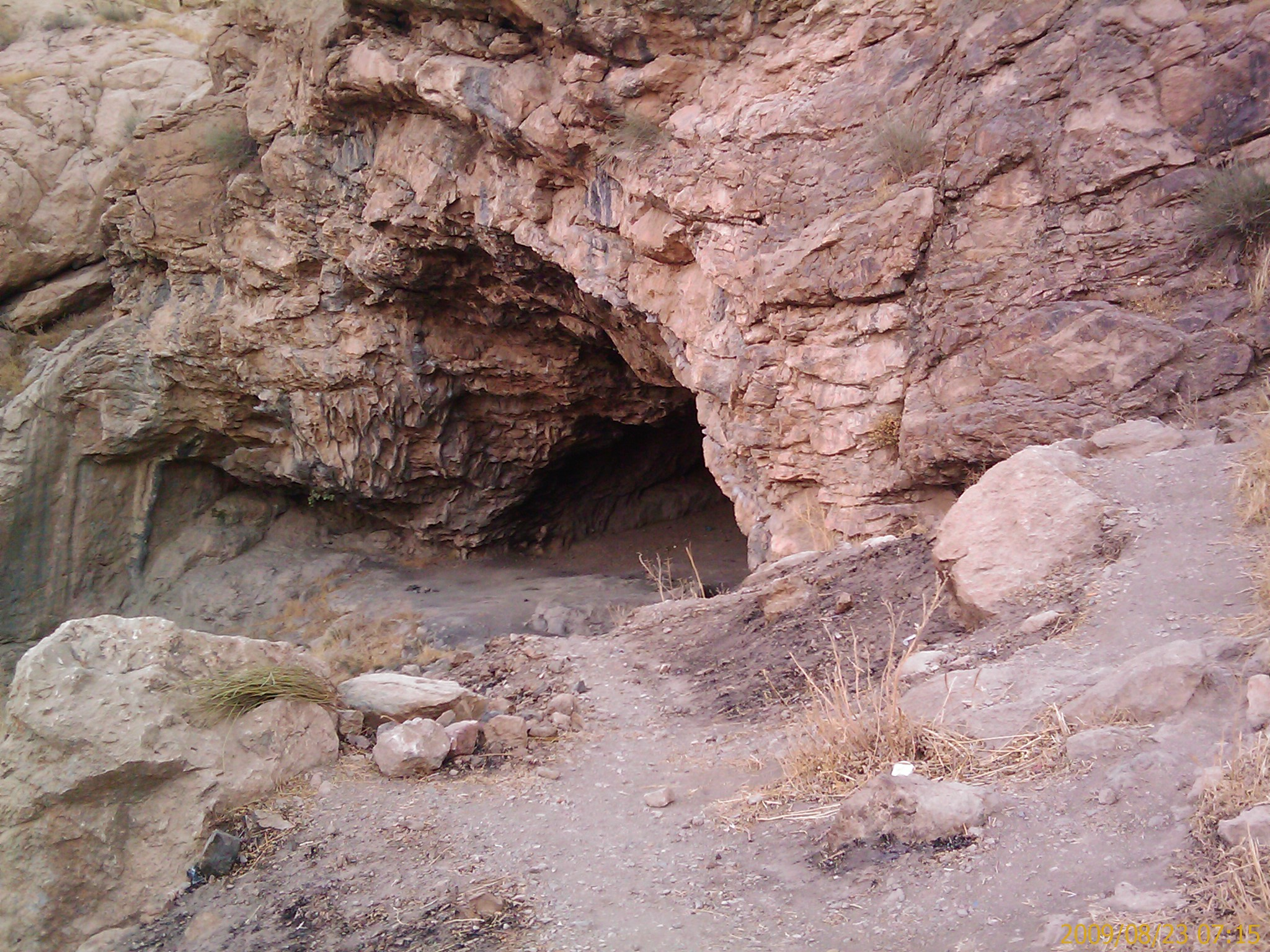
on top of small cave

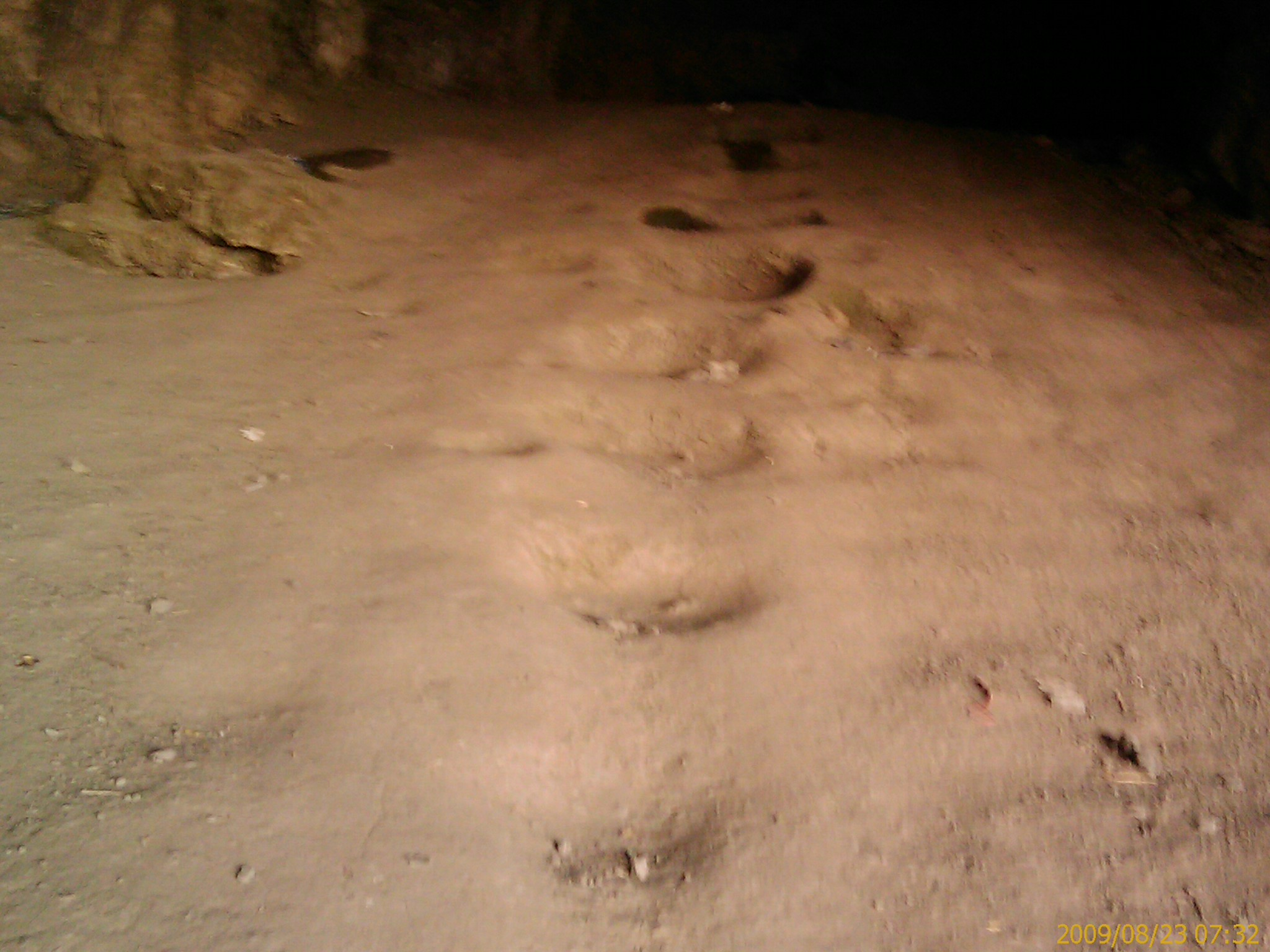
small Cave floor due to rain water from roof to cool wrought

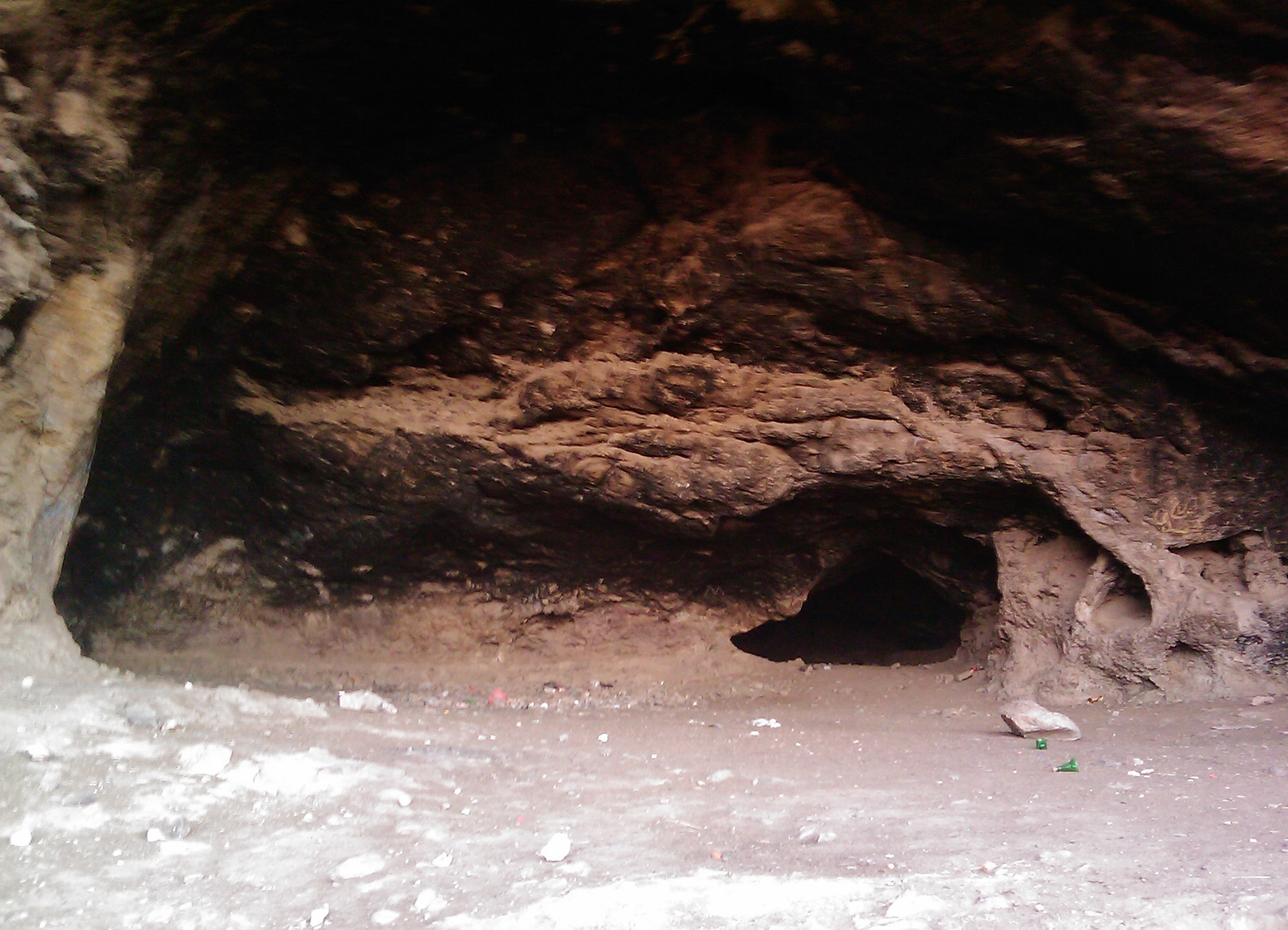
inside the cave. in the end of the cave we can see tunnel

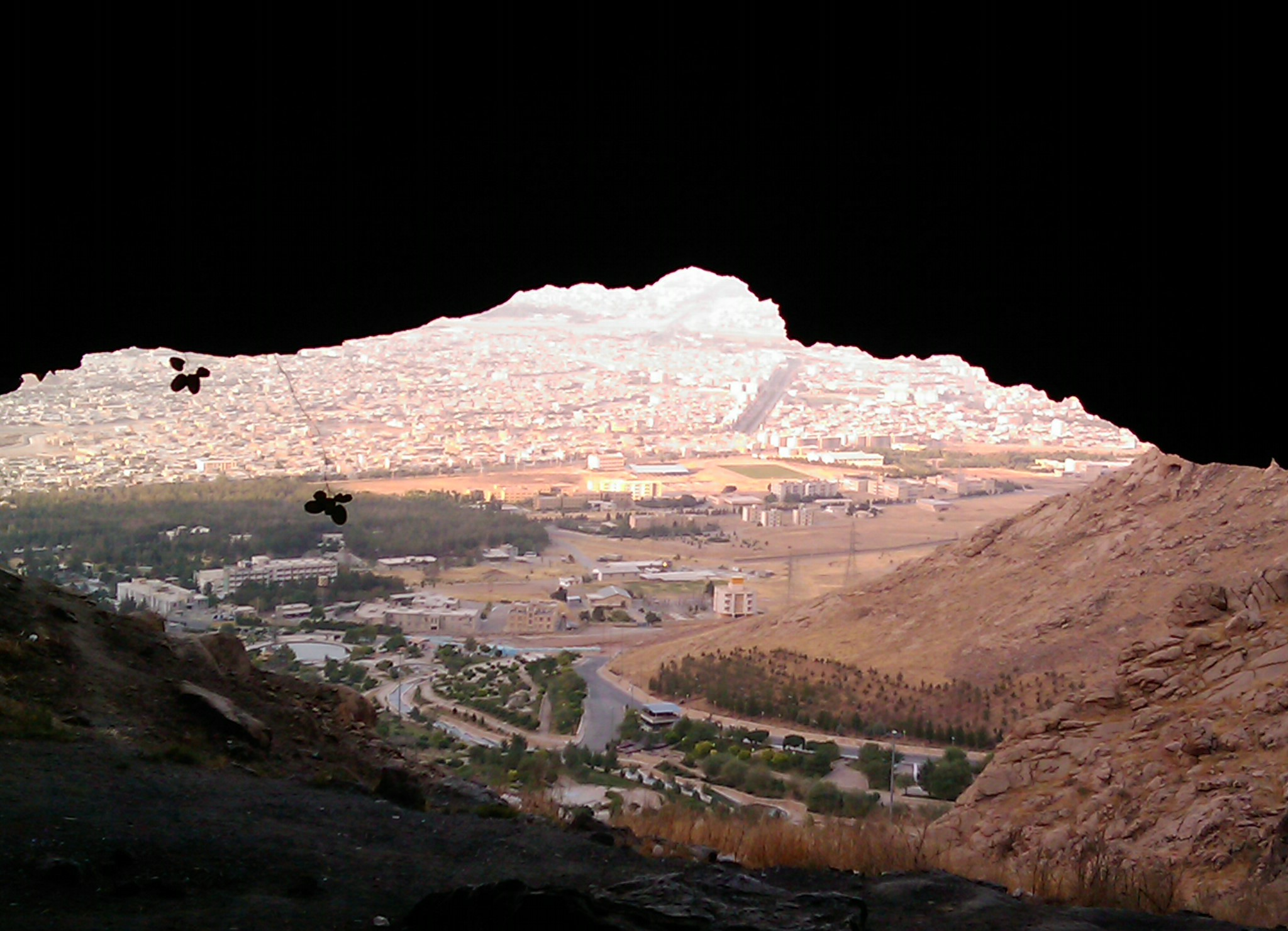
inside big cave; in front of cave is Park of Kuhestan (mountain's park)

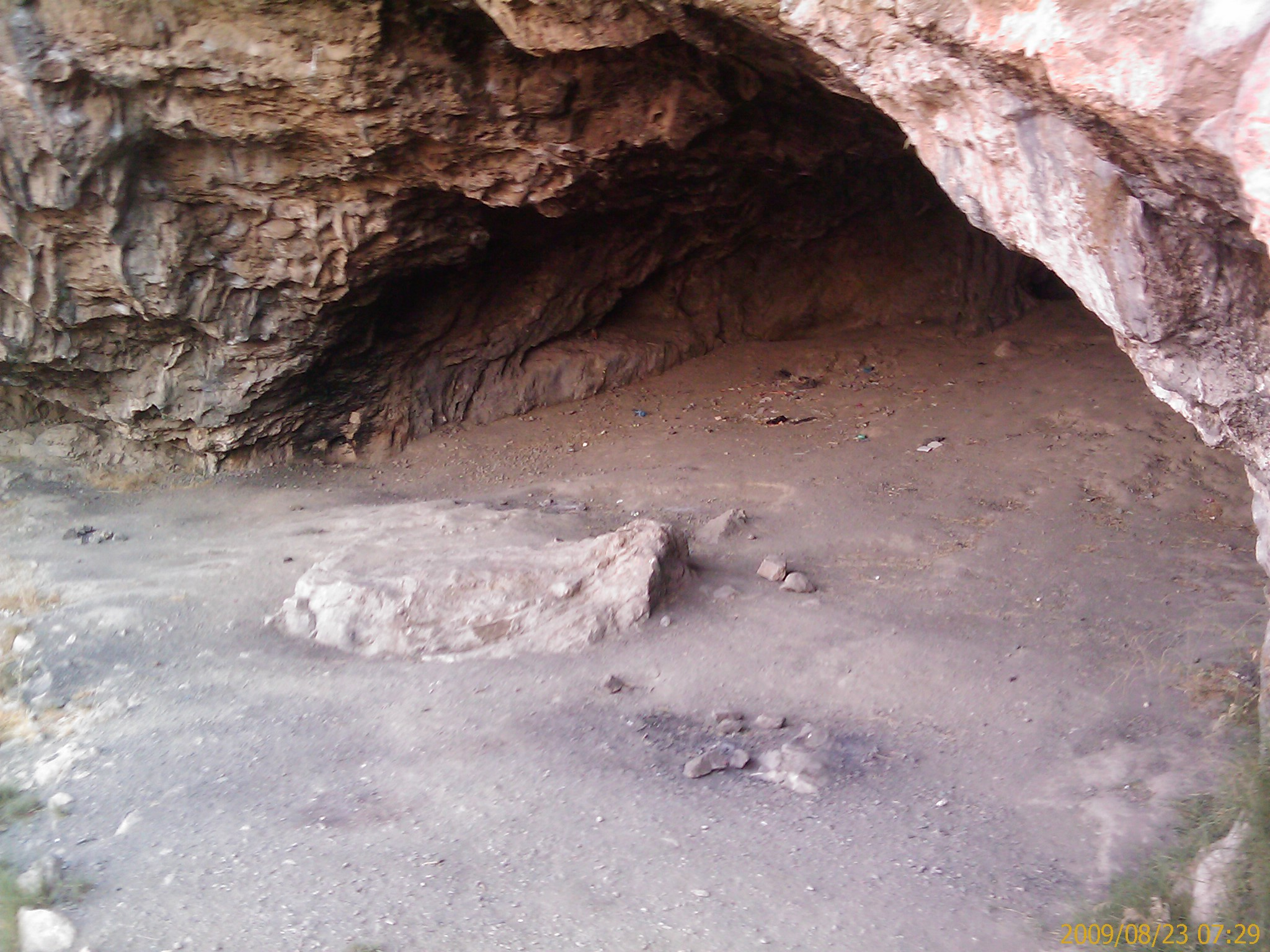
outside small cave

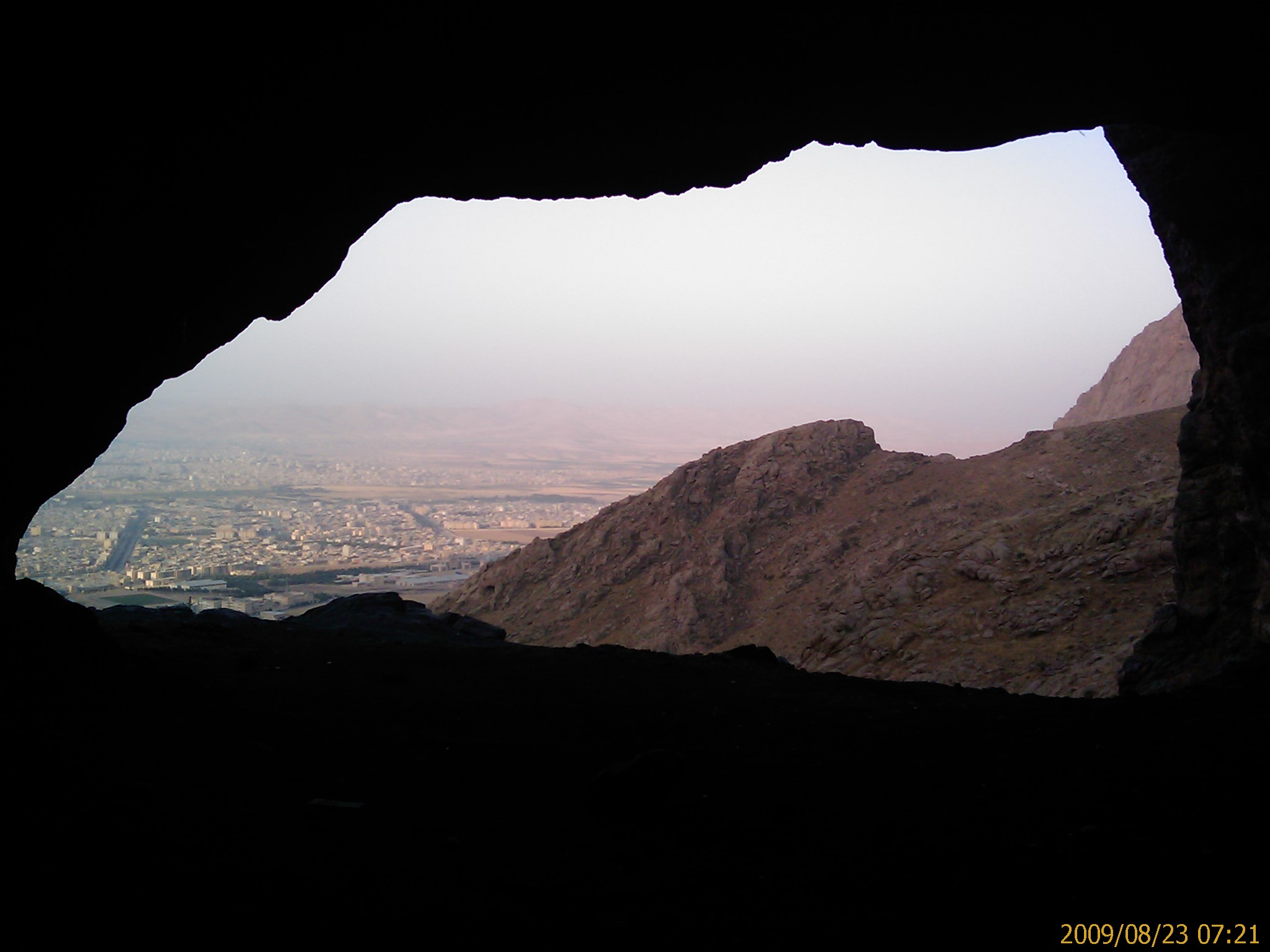
inside small cave; in front of cave is kermanshah city

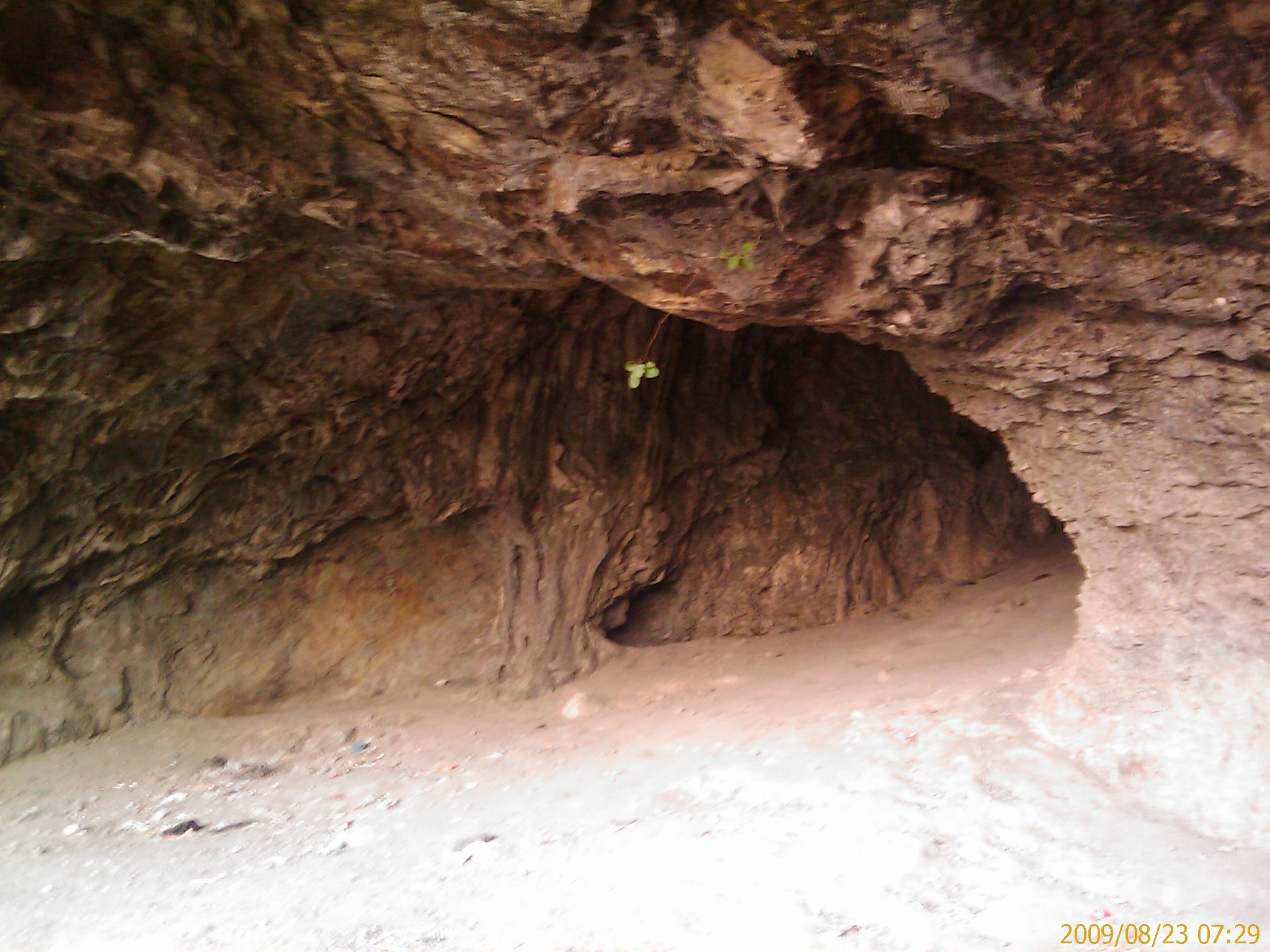
inside small cave

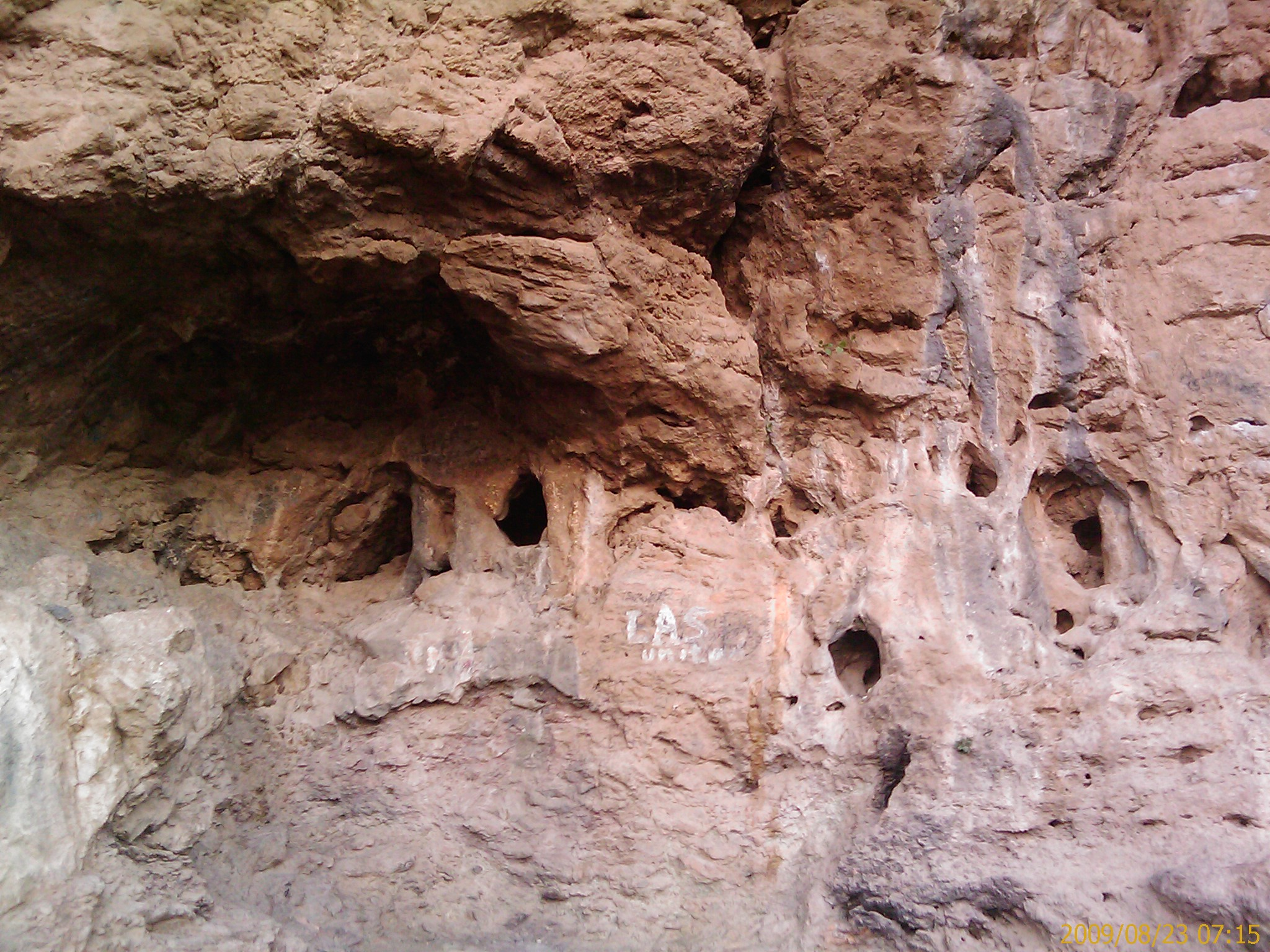
inside big cave, view of hole one wall
