= Kashafrud =

Archaeological site in Iran

Kashafrud Basin
- کشف‌رود (Persian)
- Type: Archaeological site
- Periods: Lower Paleolithic
- Region: Iran

Kashafrud Basin (Persian: کشف‌رود) is an archaeological site in Iran, known for the Lower Palaeolithic artifacts collected there; these are the oldest-known evidence for human occupation of Iran. Kashafrud includes a cluster of sites which are located 35 km to 85 km southeast of Mashhad, near the Kashafrud River. The French geologist Claude Thibault, in collaboration with the Iranian geologist Ali Ariai, conducted surveys in the Kashfrud basin east of Mashhad in 1974–75, during which 80 stone artifacts were collected from seven open areas.

== Collections ==
The largest of these collections were found near the village of Abravan and other large collections in Chahak and Baghbaghu. The survey identified three major alluvial units that are roughly attributed to the Lower, Middle, and upper Pleistocene. Many of the findings are attributed to the Lower Pleistocene gravel layer that lies on a thick layer of sand. In an article, Thibaut published the results of a preliminary study of stone artifacts and their geological context in 1977.

The discovered collection was sent to the National Museum of Iran after the examination. The collection was transferred to the Paleolithic Department of the Museum in the early 2000s and was re-examined by Fereidoun Biglari. His re-analysis of the collection revealed that some of the specimens are naturally broken quartz fragments. But most specimens are man-made and include core-chopper, simple flakes, and tools such as scrapers, notches, and borers.

On the basis of their geological contexts, this collection is more than 800,000 years old. Thus, Kashfar Rud is one of the oldest human settlements in Iran. A number of stone tools discovered by Kashafrud are displayed in the Paleolithic Hall of the National Museum of Iran. See.

There are some collections of simple core and flake stone artifacts collected by C. Thibault in 1974–75. The tools are Olduwan-like and mainly made of quartz. Thibault suggested a Lower Pleistocene age (more than 800,000 years ago) for the localities. The lithic assemblages were re-analyzed in National Museum of Iran and the results are published in a general synthesis about Iranian Lower Paleolithic.

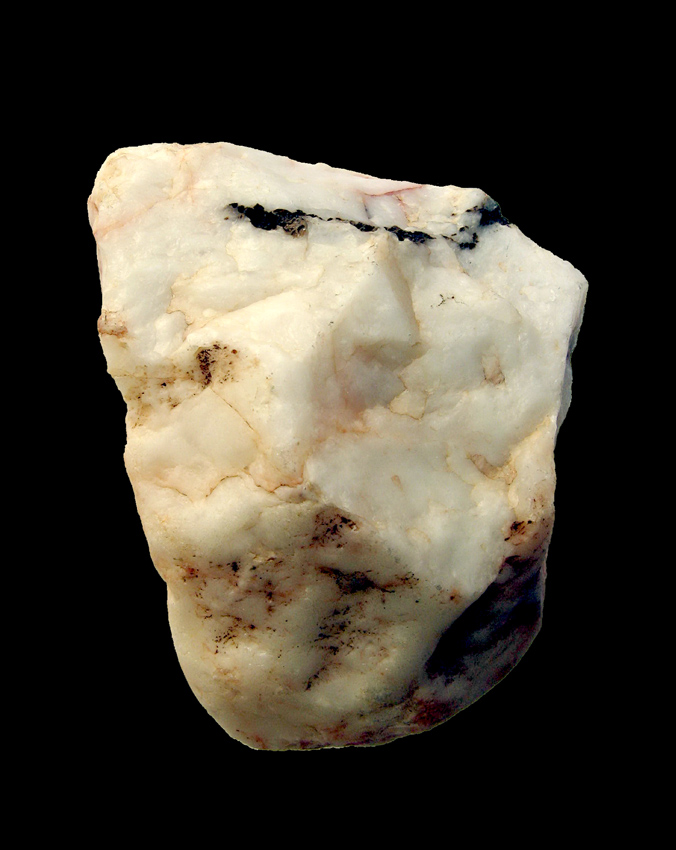
Chopper, Kashafrud, Iran, Lower Paleolithic, National Museum of Iran

== See also ==
- Kashafrud River
