= Warwasi =

Cave and archaeological site in Iran

- location in Iran
- 34°27′34″N 47°6′18″E
- Periods: from Middle Paleolithic to late Epipaleolithic
- Location: north of Kermanshah
- Region: Iran

Warwasi is a Paleolithic rockshelter site located at north of Kermanshah in western Iran. It was excavated by Bruce Howe under direction of late Robert Braidwood in the 1960s. This site contains a rich archaeological sequence from Middle Paleolithic to late Epipaleolithic.
