= Darband Cave =

Cave and archaeological site in Iran

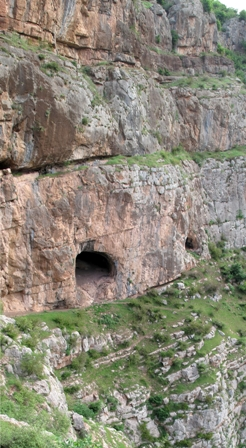
- Entrance of the Darband Cave

- location in
- 36°50′08″N 49°39′32″E
- Periods: Lower Paleolithic
- Location: Gilan Province
- Region: northern Iran

Site notes
- Excavation dates: 2012
- Archaeologists: Fereidoun Biglari

Darband Cave (Persian: غار دربند) is a Lower Paleolithic site in the Gilan Province in northern Iran, located on the north side of a deep tributary canyon of the Siahrud River, a tributary of the Sefid-Rud River that flows into the Caspian Sea.

The cave contains evidence of the earliest prehistoric human cave occupation during the Lower Paleolithic in Iran. Stone artifacts and animal fossils were discovered by a group of Iranian archaeologists of the Department of Paleolithic of the National Museum of Iran and ICHTO of Gilan. The site dates back to the late Middle Pleistocene period. The site was excavated by a team under the direction of Fereidoun Biglari in 2012

== Bear remains ==
The presence of large numbers of cave bear and brown bear remains and sparse stone artifacts at the site indicates that Darband primarily represents a bear den. The co-occurrence of artifacts and bear bones does not imply human predation or scavenging. Because there are no clear cut marks, except a few burning signs on the bear bones, they probably accumulated through natural processes
