= Ancient grains =

Small, hard, dry seeds used as food

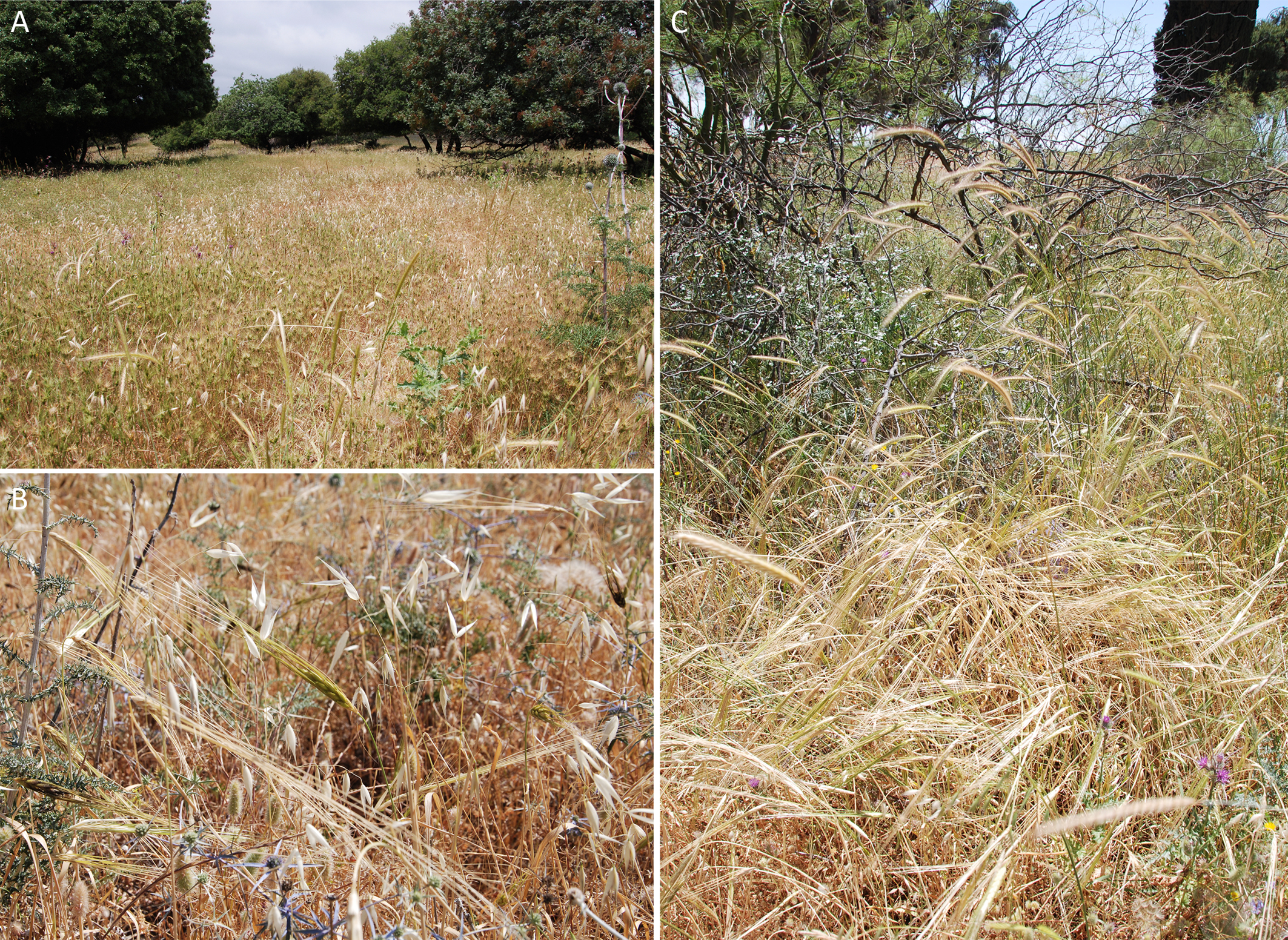
Wild cereals and other wild grasses in northern Israel

Ancient grains is a marketing term used to describe a category of grains and pseudocereals that are purported to have been minimally changed by selective breeding over recent millennia, as opposed to more widespread cereals such as corn, rice and modern varieties of wheat, which are the product of thousands of years of selective breeding. Ancient grains are often marketed as being more nutritious than modern grains, though their health benefits over modern varieties have been disputed by some nutritionists.

Ancient grains include varieties of wheat: spelt, Khorasan wheat (Kamut), einkorn, and emmer; the grains millet, barley, teff, oats, and sorghum; and the pseudocereals quinoa, amaranth, buckwheat, and chia. Some authors consider bulgur and freekeh to be ancient grains, though they are usually made from ordinary wheat. Modern wheat is a hybrid descendant of three wheat species considered to be ancient grains: spelt, einkorn, and emmer.

== History ==
The origin of grains goes back to the Neolithic Revolution about 10,000 years ago, when prehistoric communities started to make the transition from hunter-gatherer to farmer. Modern varieties of grains have been developed over time through mutation, selective cropping, breeding and research in biotechnology. Ancient grains, however, are said to be largely unchanged from their initial domesticated varieties.

Various forms of archaeobotanical evidence, such as carbonized and semicarbonized grains, coprolites and imprints of grains, husks or spikelets on potsherds, have been found during excavations of Neolithic sites.

Ancient grains played a role in the spiritual life of several ancient civilizations, from the Aztecs to the Greeks and Egyptians. Quinoa was called the "mother of all grains" and considered sacred by the Inca people. Amaranth was likewise considered sacred by the Aztecs, and was used as part of a religious ceremony, its cultivation being banned by Spanish colonial authorities. Farro grains are mentioned in the Old Testament.

The first reference to ancient grains as a health food was in the Daily News (New York) in 1996. Since then the popularity of ancient grains as a food has increased, and in 2011 the gluten-free food market was valued at $1.6 billion.

== Types ==
=== Wheat ===
Archaeobotanical studies indicate three species of wheat existed in the distant past. These are Triticum sphaerococcum, Triticum vulgare and Triticum compactum. The first two hexaploid species are still cultivated in modern times, mostly in Northern India.

The diploid species einkorn and tetraploid species emmer are early wheat species. Evidence for them dates to the Bus Mordeh phase (7500 BC to 6500 BC) recovered from excavation at Ali Kosh in Iran and somewhat later evidence from Nea Nikomedeia. Triticum durum Desf may once have been cultivated in Ancient Egypt.

Some grains found in India are:

- Triticum sphaerococcum – also called "Indian Short Wheat", this is the earliest known cultivated wheat from India with evidence from the Chalcolithic site Harappa and the later site Ter
- Triticum vulgare – also called "Bread wheat" evidence has been found at Chanhudaro, Mohenjodaro and Navdatolo
- Triticum compactum – found at Harappa, Mundigak and Mohenjodaro
- Triticum Sp. – found at Navdaroli, Inamgaon, Atranjikhera and Kayatha
- Triticum Sp. Contd. – found at Songaon, Rohtak, Nevasa and Bhokardan

=== Barley ===
Along with wheat, barley (Hordeum) is one of the earliest cultivated crops. It was commonly cultivated throughout the Near East and Southern Europe in its hulled form, and the domesticated two row species may have originated at Beidha, Jarmo, or Ali Kosh. Hordeum spontaneum was found at Çatalhöyük (5850–5600 BC) and Hordeum distichum at Ali Kosh (6750–6000 BC). In India it was mostly cultivated in the north and central regions, extending only as far south as Inamgaon and Nevasa.

=== Rice ===
Rice is believed to have been cultivated at Non Nok Tha in Thailand since 3500 BC where impressions of grains of rice have been found on potsherds. Other cultivation sites include the Neolithic sites of Yangshao, Liu Tzuchen, Anhui, Kionsi, Zhejiang and Hubei.

==== Wild rice ====
Not directly related to domesticated rice, wild rice has nearly twice the dietary fibre of Oryza sativa and Oryza glaberrima and contains around 15% protein and lipids including essential omega-3 and omega-6 fatty acids. The Anishinaabe are thought to have harvested wild rice in prehistoric North America, according to archaeologists studying the clay linings of thermal features and jigging pits associated with parching and threshing of the plant.

=== Millet ===
The origin of finger millet (also called ragi) is debated with various proposals placing it in Africa (Abyssinia), or India. Charred grains of cultivated and wild ragi have been found at the Neolithic site Hallur in southern India. Wild ragi (eleusine indica Gaertn) is known only from Songaon and Bhokardan, while the cultivated form appears at Paiyampalli in Tamilnadu, Songaon and later at Bhokardan and Nevasa in Maharashtra.

Cultivation of pearl millet is known from sites with semi-arid climate, occurring at Hallur, Rangpur and Nevasa. Cultivation of pearl millet in modern India (where it is also called bajra) is mostly limited to the country's semi-arid regions. In Africa evidence has been found dating to the Naghez phase, but it is not known whether these were cultivated. Both wild and cultivated grain impressions were found at Le Baidla I.

Charred grains of Paspalum scrobiculatum (Kodo millet), dating to the Satavahana period, have been found at Nevasa. Sorghum vulgare is known from semi-arid parts of Rajasthan and Maharashtra like Inamgaon, Paunar and Ahar.

== Nutritional claims ==
Ancient grains are rich in protein, some micronutrients, and dietary fiber. Some nutritionists state that they are not inherently more healthful than modern grains, and that ancient and modern grains have similar nutritional content when eaten as whole grains.

Some, but not all, ancient grains are gluten-free. Amaranth, quinoa, buckwheat, millet, and teff are gluten-free, but the ancient kinds of wheat (including spelt, einkorn, and Khorasan wheat) are not.

== Gallery ==
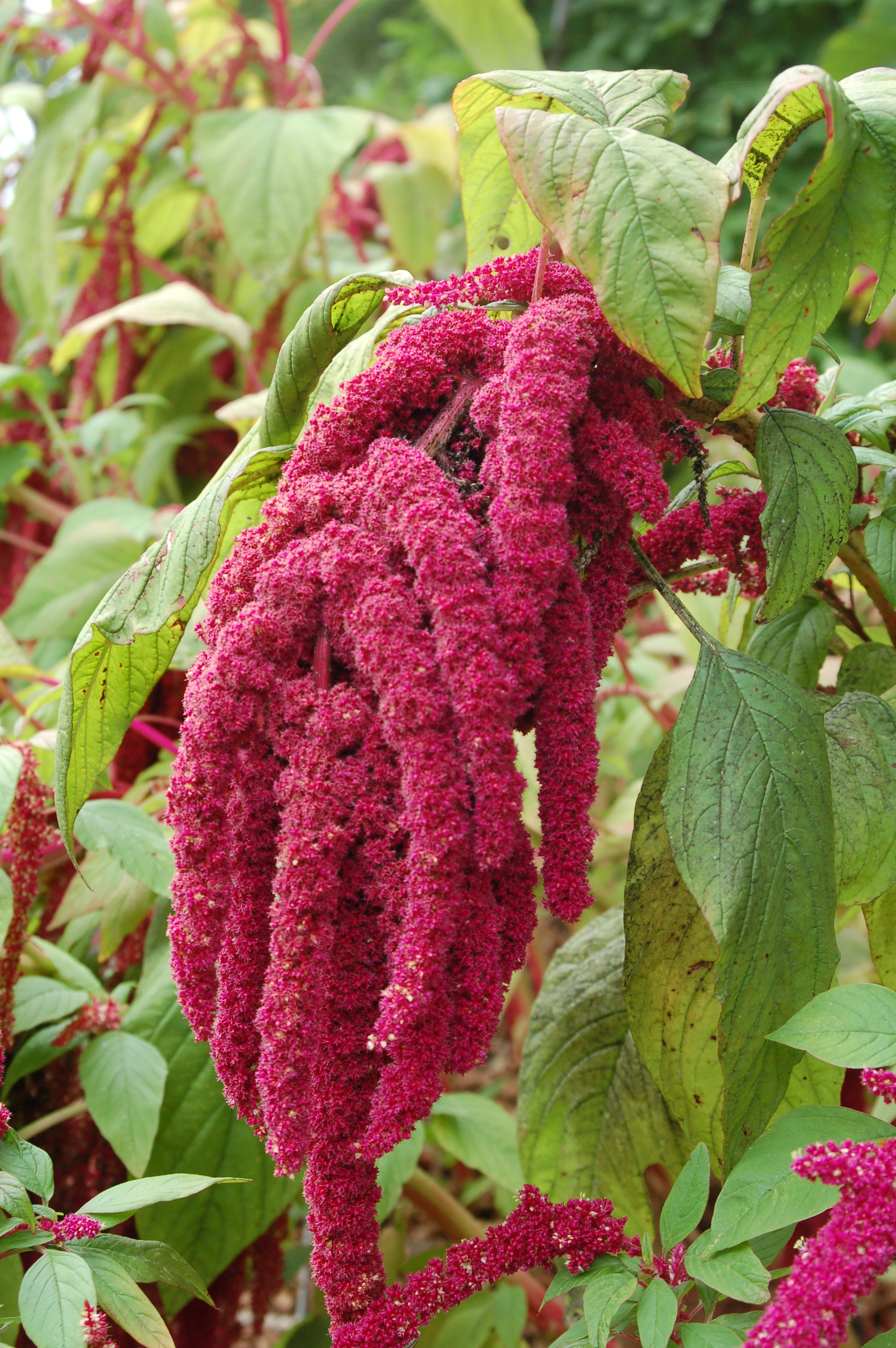
Amaranthus caudatus species of Amaranthus

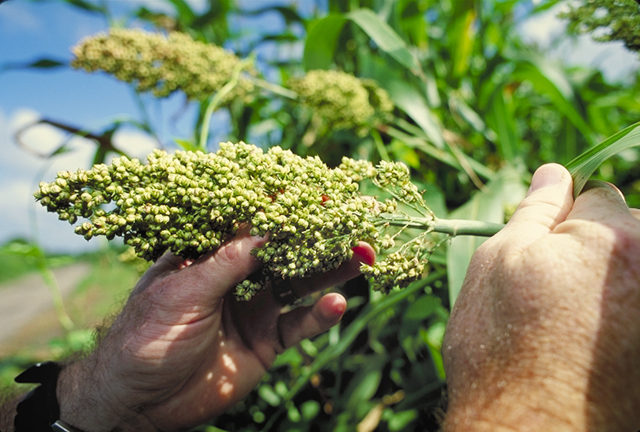
Sorghum

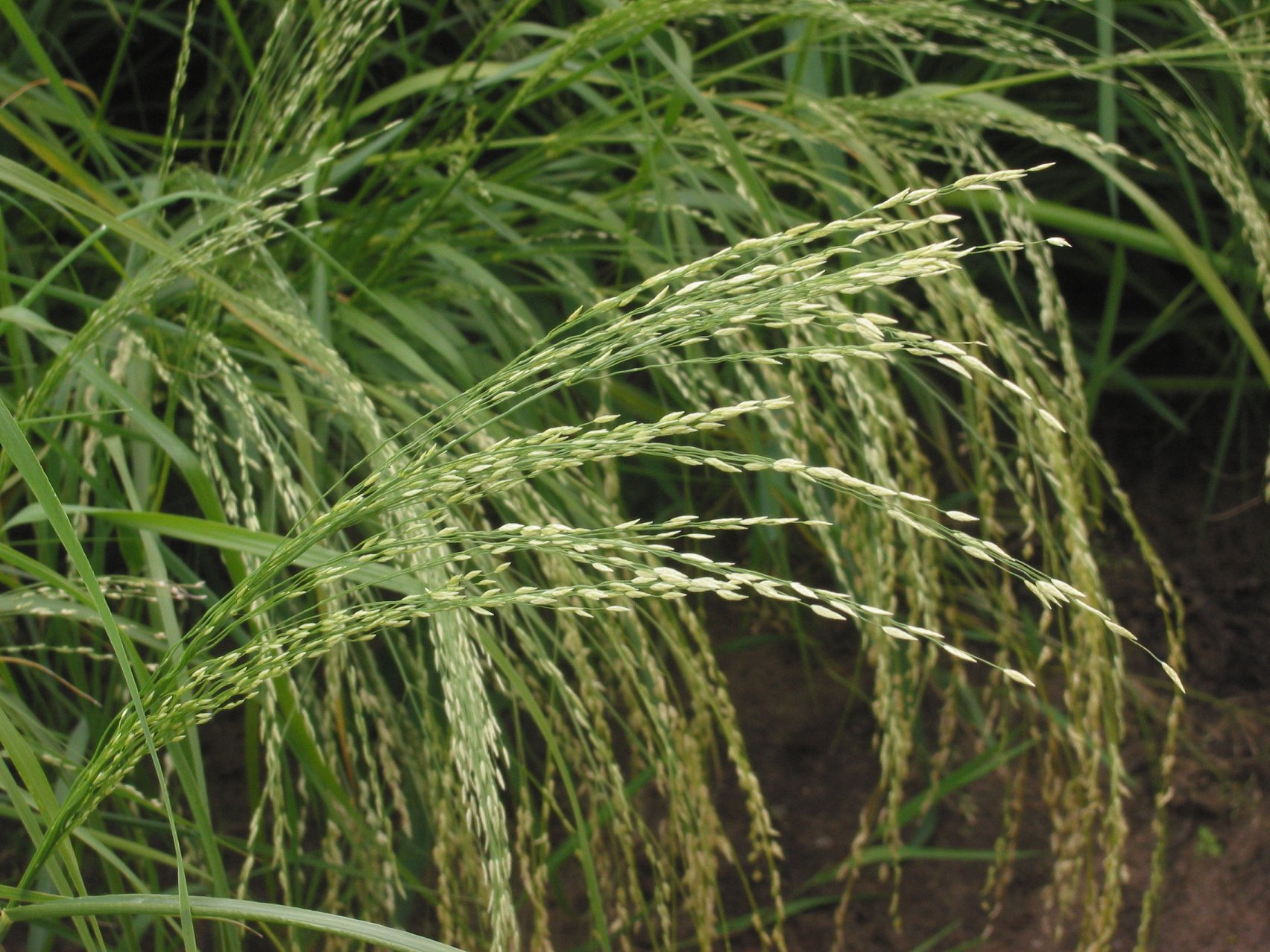
Teff

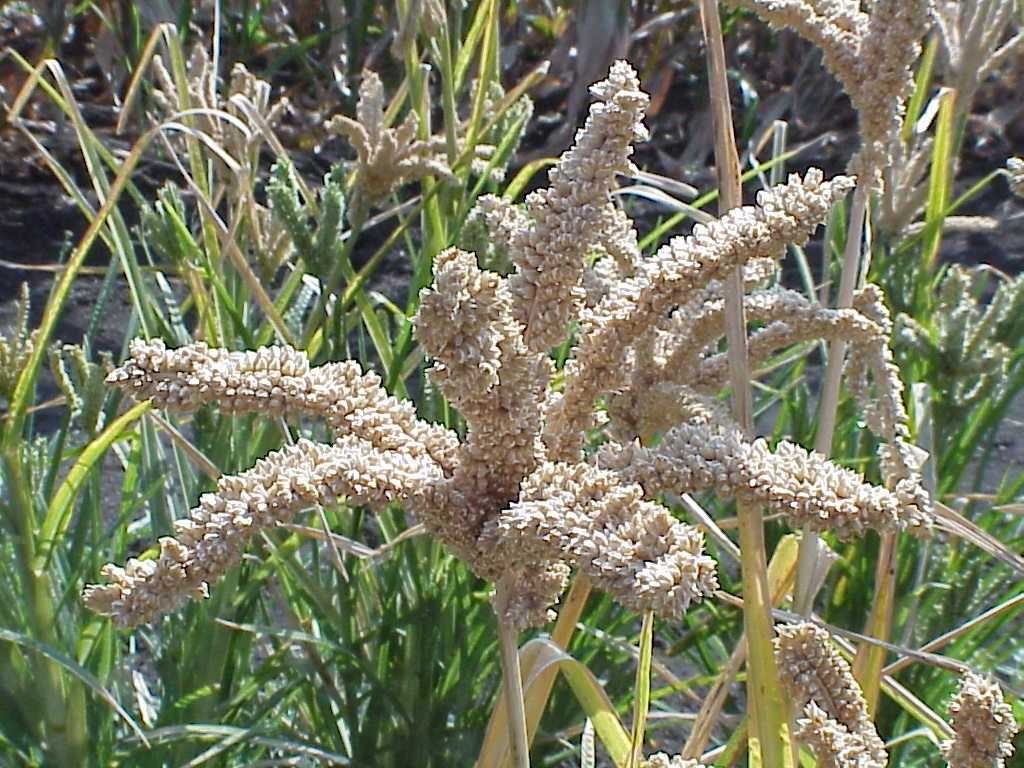
Millet

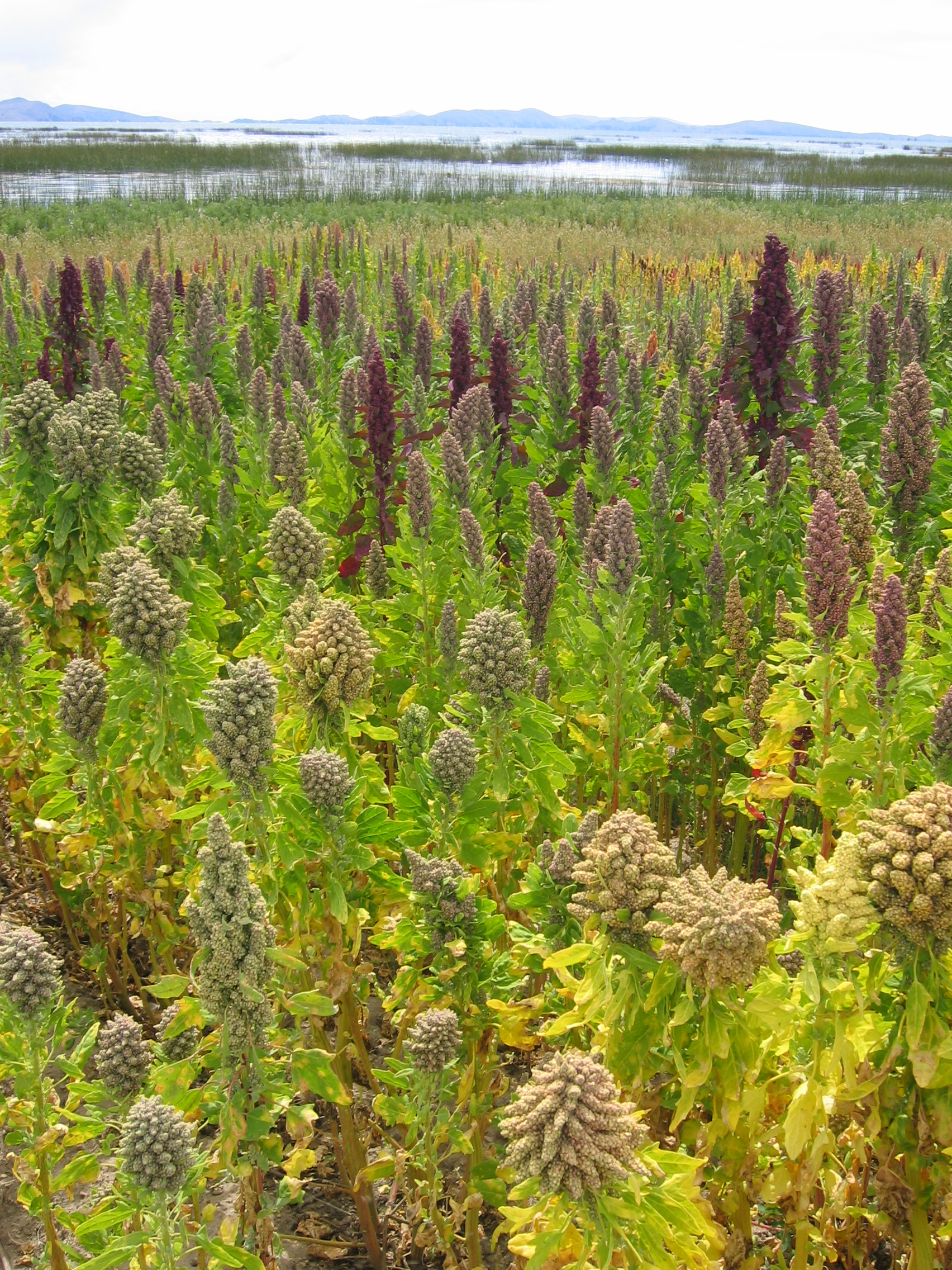
Quinoa

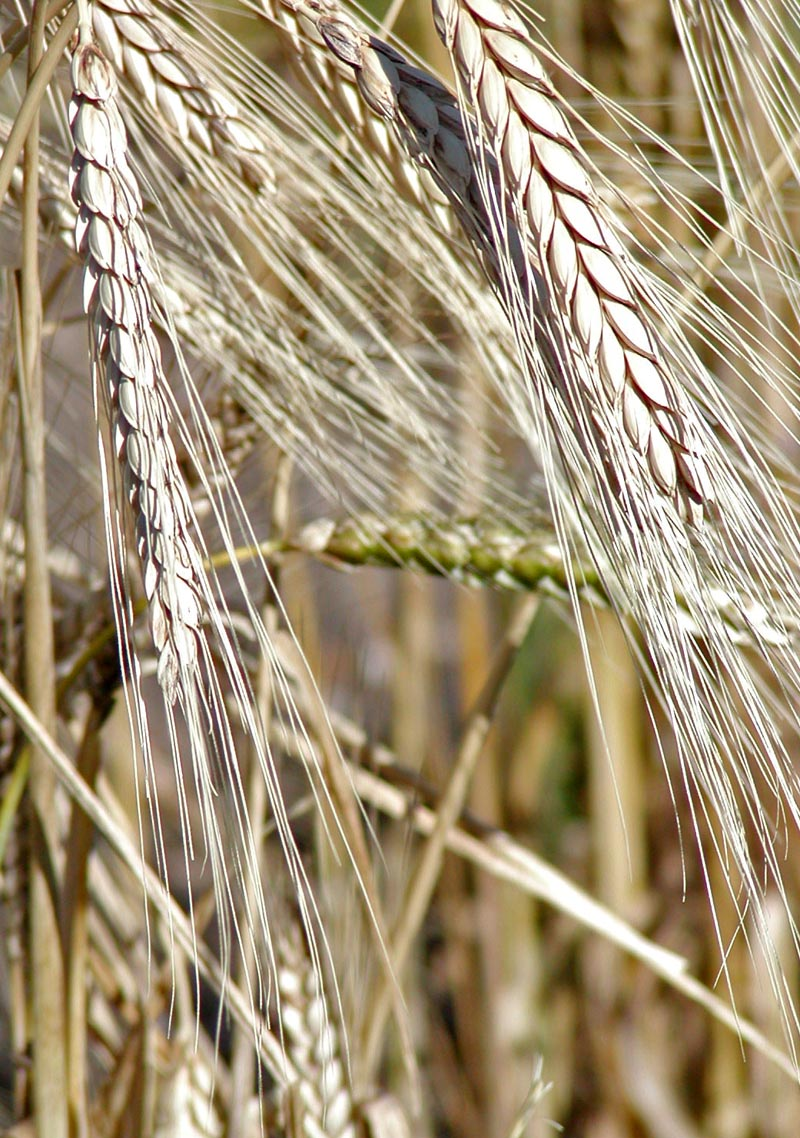
Khorasan wheat (Kamut)

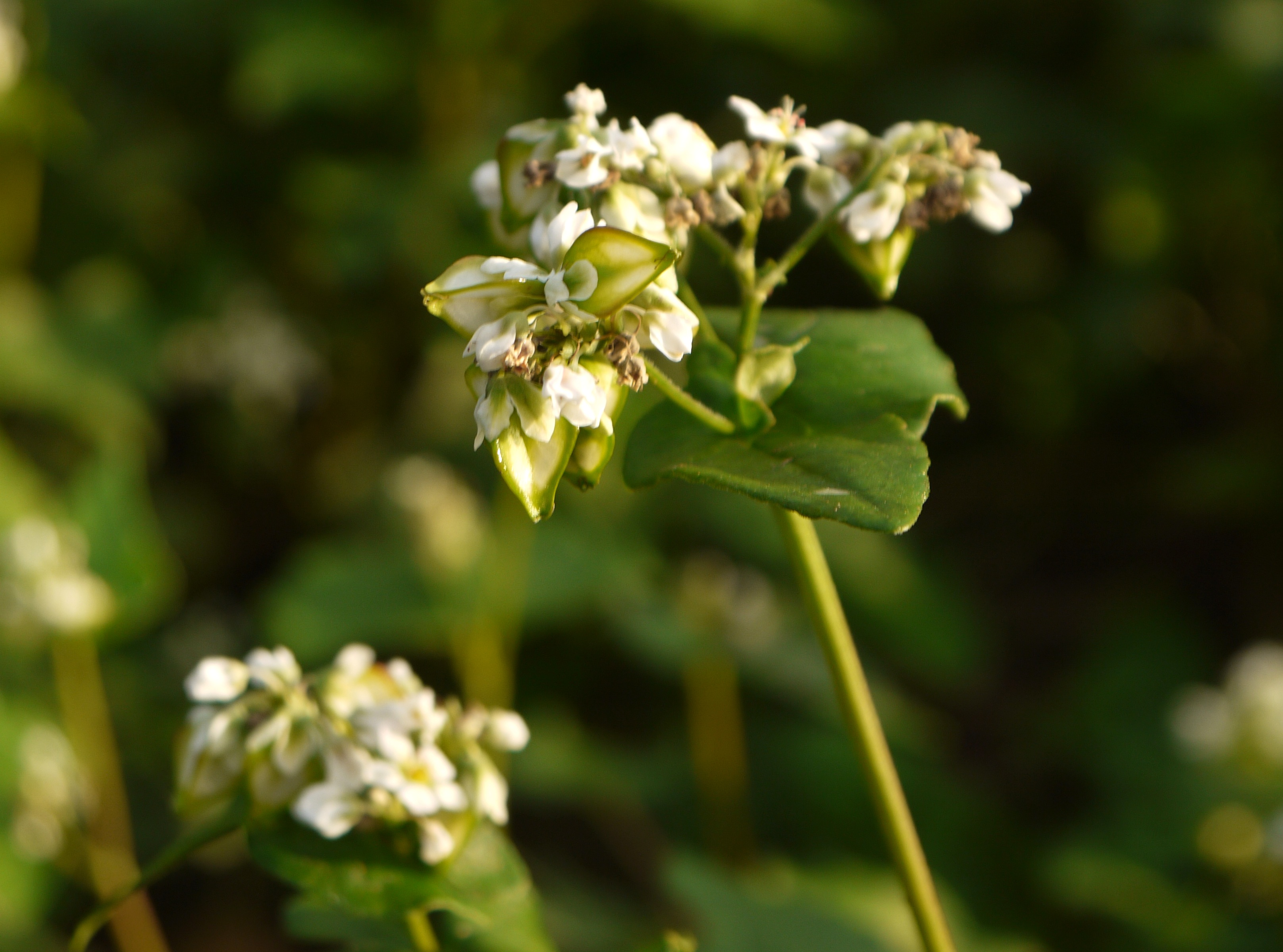
Buckwheat

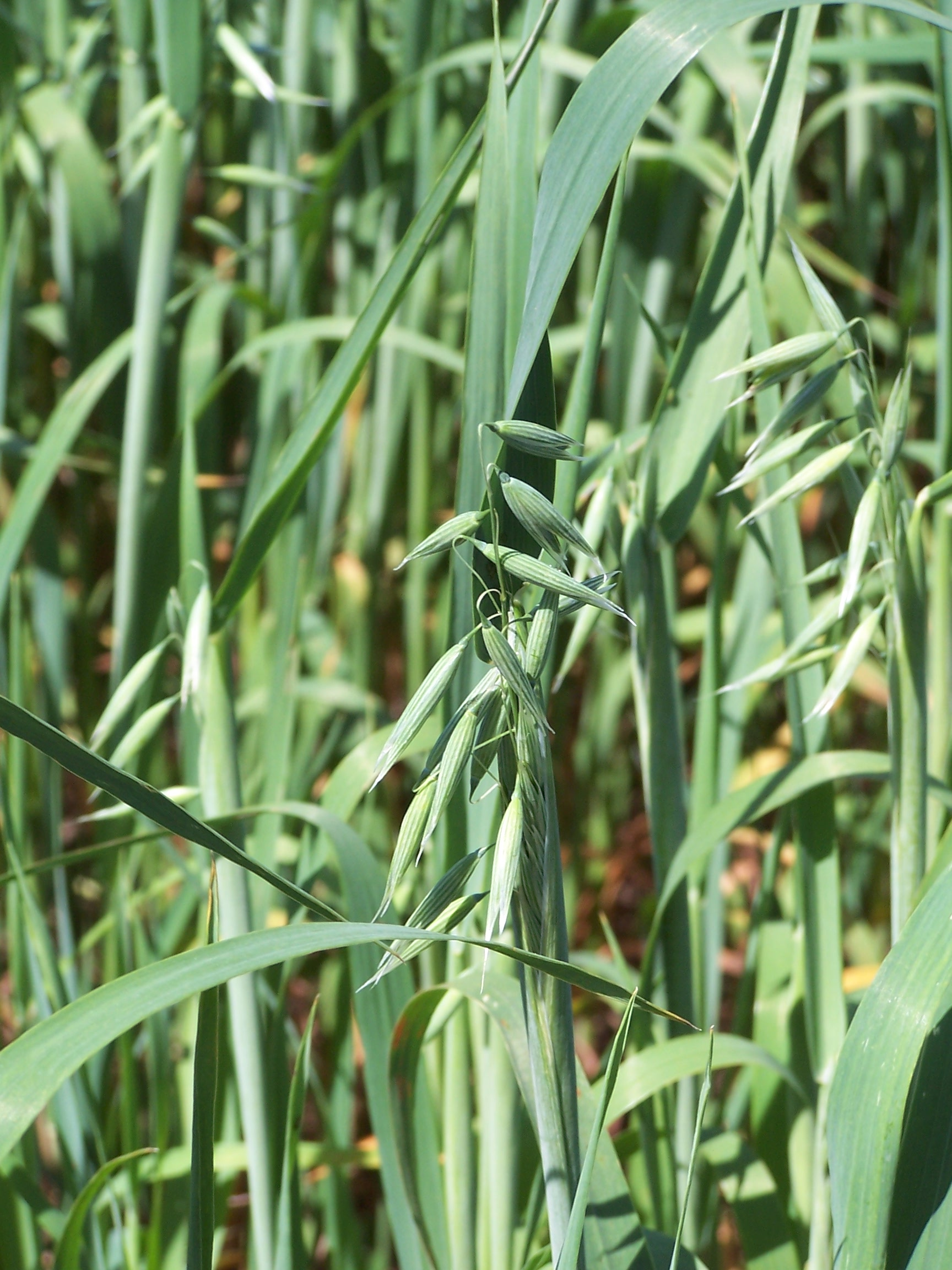
Oat

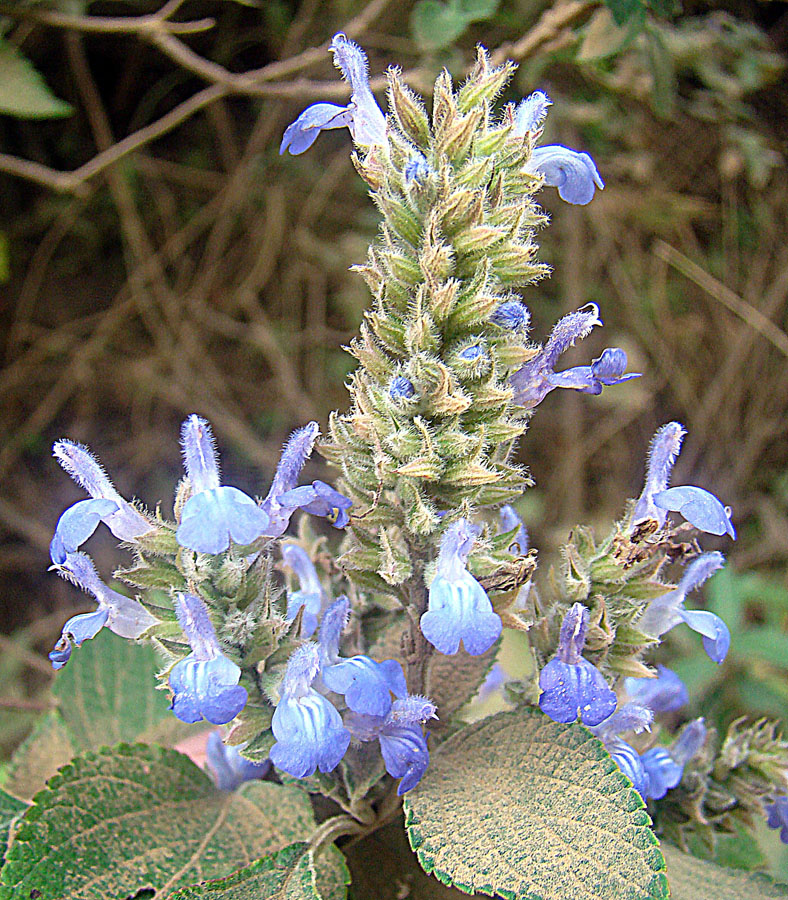
Chia

== See also ==
- List of ancient dishes and foods
- Neolithic founder crops
- Whole grain
