= Hilly Flanks =

Area around the Fertile Crescent of West Asia

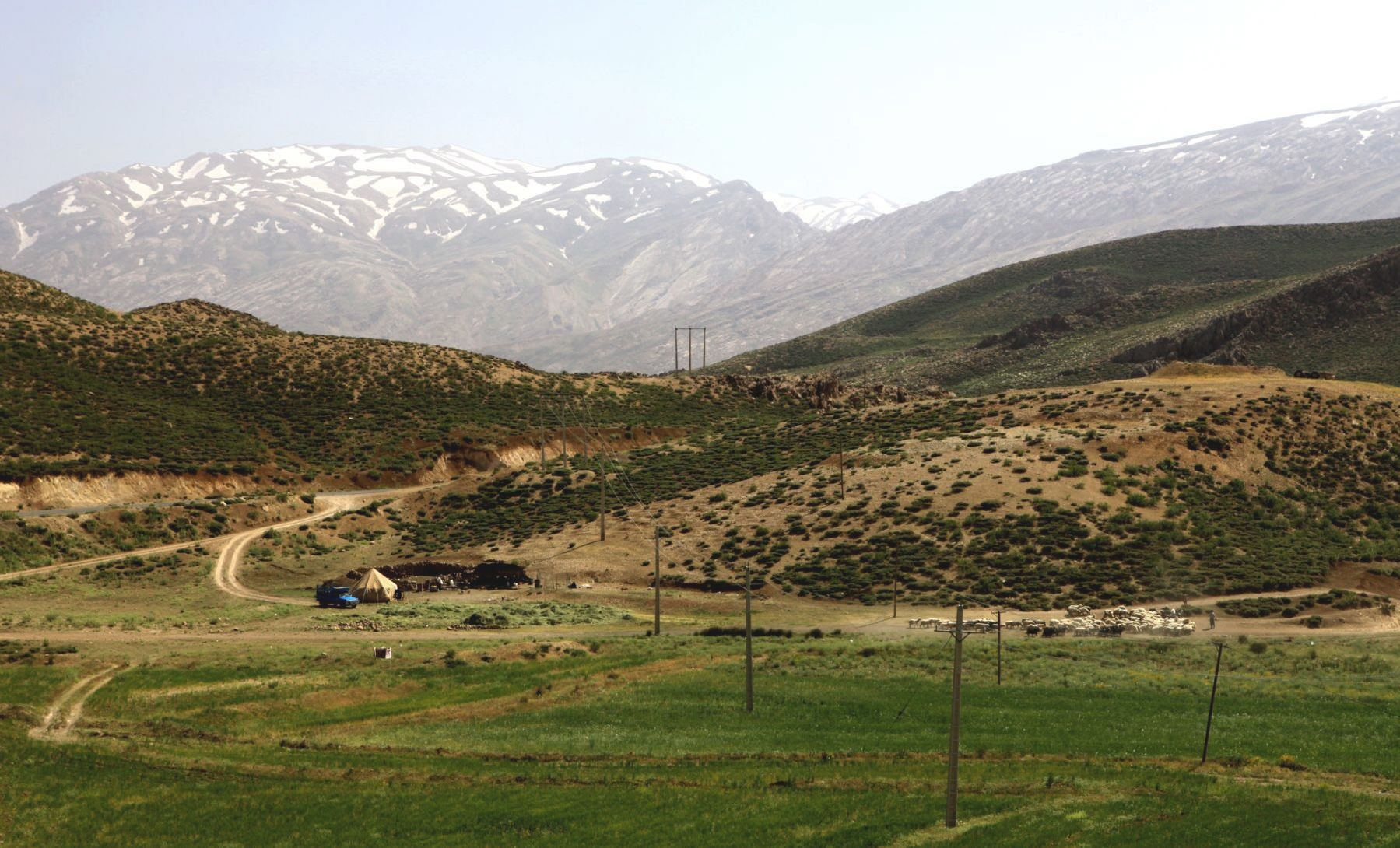
- A section of the Hilly Flanks region with the Zagros Mountains in the background.

Geography
- Location: Iran, Iraq, and Turkey; West Asia

The Hilly Flanks are the upland areas surrounding the Fertile Crescent of West Asia, including the foothills of the Zagros Mountains, the Taurus Mountains, and the highlands of the Levant. The Hilly Flanks foothill chain spans over 1000 miles, including parts of Turkey, northwestern Iraq, and western Iran. The region is just north of Mesopotamia, with similar characteristics of fertility with the added trait of foothills and plateaus.

The term was coined by Robert Braidwood in 1948. He proposed that the Neolithic Revolution began in the Hilly Flanks because these areas received enough rainfall for agriculture without irrigation. He also observed that many of the wild progenitors of domesticated crops had their natural habitats in the Hilly Flanks, as did wild sheep and goat. His theory was in opposition to the oasis theory of V. Gordon Childe, which placed the origins of agriculture in well-watered desert refugia such as Mesopotamia. Ultimately, archaeological investigations proved Braidwood correct.

The region has been the subject of numerous archaeological expeditions intending to discover more about its historical culture. One such archaeological investigation by the Danish Archaeological Expedition to Iraq (DAEI) aimed to investigate the early urbanism in the upper regions of Mesopotamia. Previous survey work done in the Rania Plain, a region in the Hilly Flanks, has recorded settlement history dating back to the Late Chalcolithic Period.

Studies on pottery and clay remains in the region uncover the activities of creative expression and entertainment in Neolithic societies that settled in the region. Major emphasis in archaeological studies has been placed on the effect of the changes in climate on food management methods, particularly the shift from hunting and gathering to crop cultivation and livestock domestication. Animal husbandry include the domestication of pigs, goats, sheep, and cattle. The crops frequently harvested include barley, wheat, legumes, and grains.

== Etymology ==
The term hilly flanks has been commonly associated with a region of fertile land typically characterised by a moderately mountainous hilly nature. The moderate nature of the hills in these regions are normally due to the close proximity of the region to a mountainous region. Hence, foothills in certain regions have been dubbed hilly flanks.

Robert John Braidwood, an American archaeologist from Michigan, led the Iraq-Jarmo Project in the 1950s, which consisted of carrying out interdisciplinary research in the foothills of the Zagros Mountains. He is believed to be one of the first to coin the phrase "the hilly flanks of the Fertile Crescent" to describe this particular region.

Braidwood proposed his theory that the Hilly Flanks region was one of the first agricultural civilisations in the world given the sufficient amount of rainfall the region received. This enabled societies to carry out agriculture without irrigation. Communities were able to raise livestock in these regions. Braidwood's theory was proposed as a counterargument to that of Australian archaeologist V. Gordon Childe.

Childe proposed his Oasis Theory, which argued that the regions of North Africa and the Near East experienced desiccation, or a period of increased droughts, higher temperatures, and decreased precipitation. The lack of rainfall resulted in less fertile land that posed issues for inhabitants of the region, which then forced civilisations to mobilise to oases and river valley regions in Mesopotamia. However, further archaeological research expeditions, such as the Iraq-Jarmo Project, provided evidence that supported Braidwood's theory.

The term hilly flanks was also used by a team of anthropologists from the Department of Anthropology, Washington University in St. Louis, US to refer to the northern part of a Fertile Arc in China, similar to that of the Fertile Crescent in the Middle East.

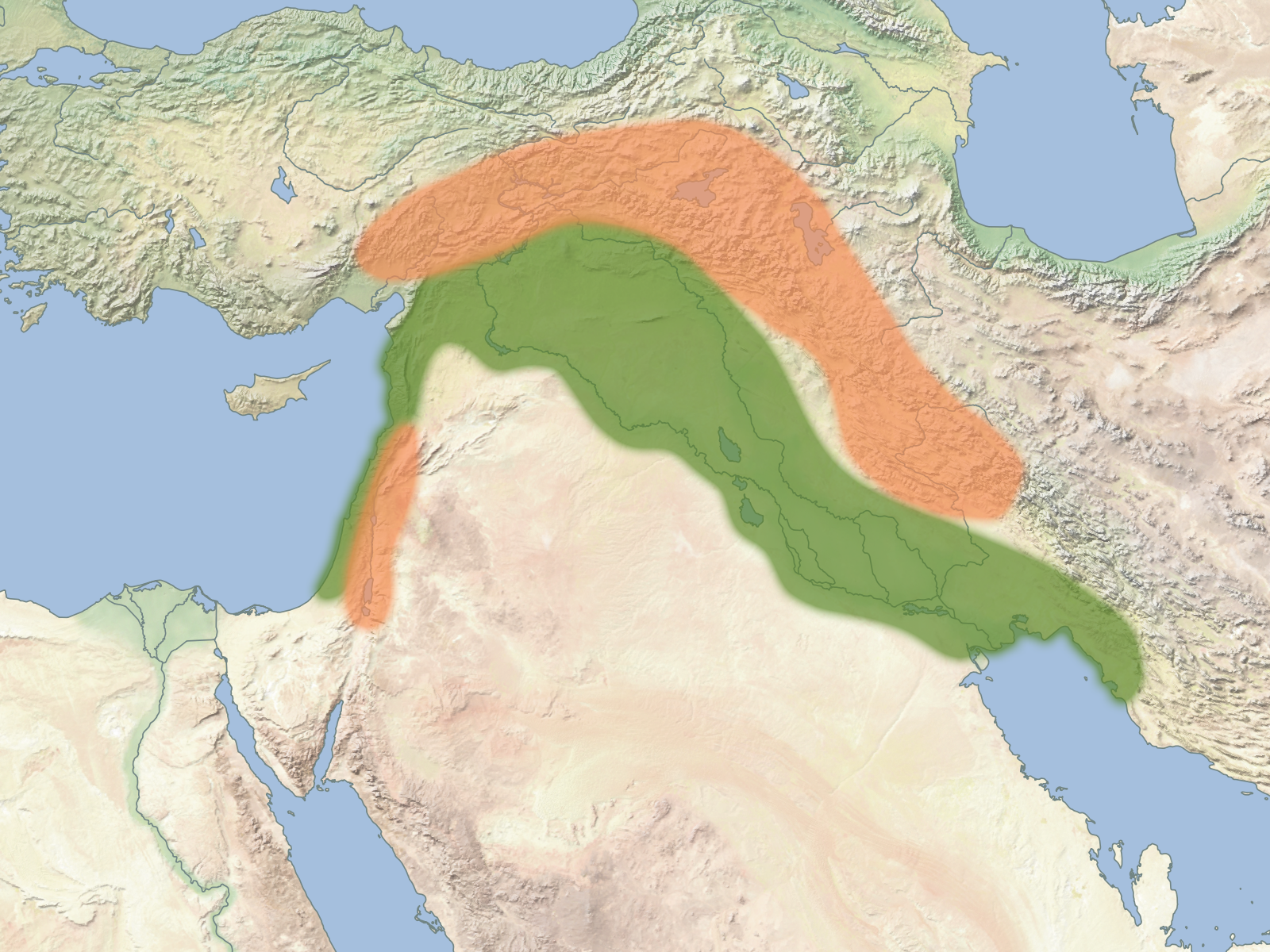
The Hilly Flanks (orange) curl around the Fertile Crescent (green)

== Geography ==
The area pertaining to the hilly flanks is predominantly characterised as the foothills of the Zagros Mountains. Intercepting through the modern-day borders of Turkey, Iraq, and Iran, the region spans over 1000 miles from the lower central area of the Turkish peninsula, curling around the northern sector of the Tigris river, then running along the foothills of the Zagros Mountain range. The natural borders of this region are the Zagros Mountains to the north, the Iranian plateau to the east, the Tigris river to the south, and the lowlands of Mesopotamia to the west.

In archaeology, the term Levant is used to describe the approximate historical region encompassing the land east of the Mediterranean in West Asia. The Levant includes the parts of the modern-day nations of Syria, Lebanon, Jordan, Israel, Palestine and Turkey. A large portion of the Hilly Flanks region lies within the northern highlands of the Levant.

Given its close proximity to the Tigris river in the Fertile Crescent, the land of the hilly flanks is fertile for agriculture and raising livestock. The majority of fertile land most effective for agricultural use consist either of plains where rivers drains out of, or fertile valleys that run through the ridges of the foothills.

The Shahrizor Plain is a prominent geographic region within the Hilly Flanks. The plain is formed by the Shahrizor basin, which is formed by the gradual descending height of the Azmar and Kurhakazhaw mountains. Many modern villages and ancient mounds are found along the basin. The Shahrizor basin is drained by many streams that join the Tanjero river. The folds of mountains that emerge in the southeast region of Shahrizor make the area difficult to traverse. The land south of the Shahrizor consists of steep, high ridges that make inhabiting and travelling difficult. The land is in the valleys of these ridges are narrow, posing issues for agriculture.

The Hilly Flanks share similar characteristics with other foothill chains, including the alluvial fans along the Jordan Valley, the Inner Asian Mountain Corridor, which is a region spanning from the Altai Mountains in Siberia to the Hindu Kush area of Afghanistan and Pakistan, and the northern China Foothill Arc. The characteristics shared include being located along elevated sites around river catchments and historically being early farming sites.

== Archaeology ==
Robert Braidwood believes that the settlements in the hilly flanks region are the world's first village farming communities, evidence of which are derived from archaeological expeditions that studied the Agricultural Revolution in the Near East. In 1950, Braidwood and his wife Linda set up the Jarmo Project to research the early domesticates in certain archaeological sites of interest in the hilly flanks region. The Jarmo Project found evidence of floral and faunal remains that helped to indicate the shift from hunting and gathering of wild species to a mode of subsistence dependent on domesticated plants, animals and their products.

Further archaeological expeditions from geologists and botanists provided evidence to supplement the understanding of Pleistocene glaciation and Holocene climate changes in the region. The evidence was obtained through archaeological projects involving the coring of Lake Van, Turkey, Lake Zeribar and Lake Mirabad in Iran. The regional environmental studies indicate aridity and lower snow lines during the Pleistocene glaciation periods, and the Holocene climate change saw increased precipitation and the shift to the Mediterranean climate known today, consisting of dry summers and wet winters.

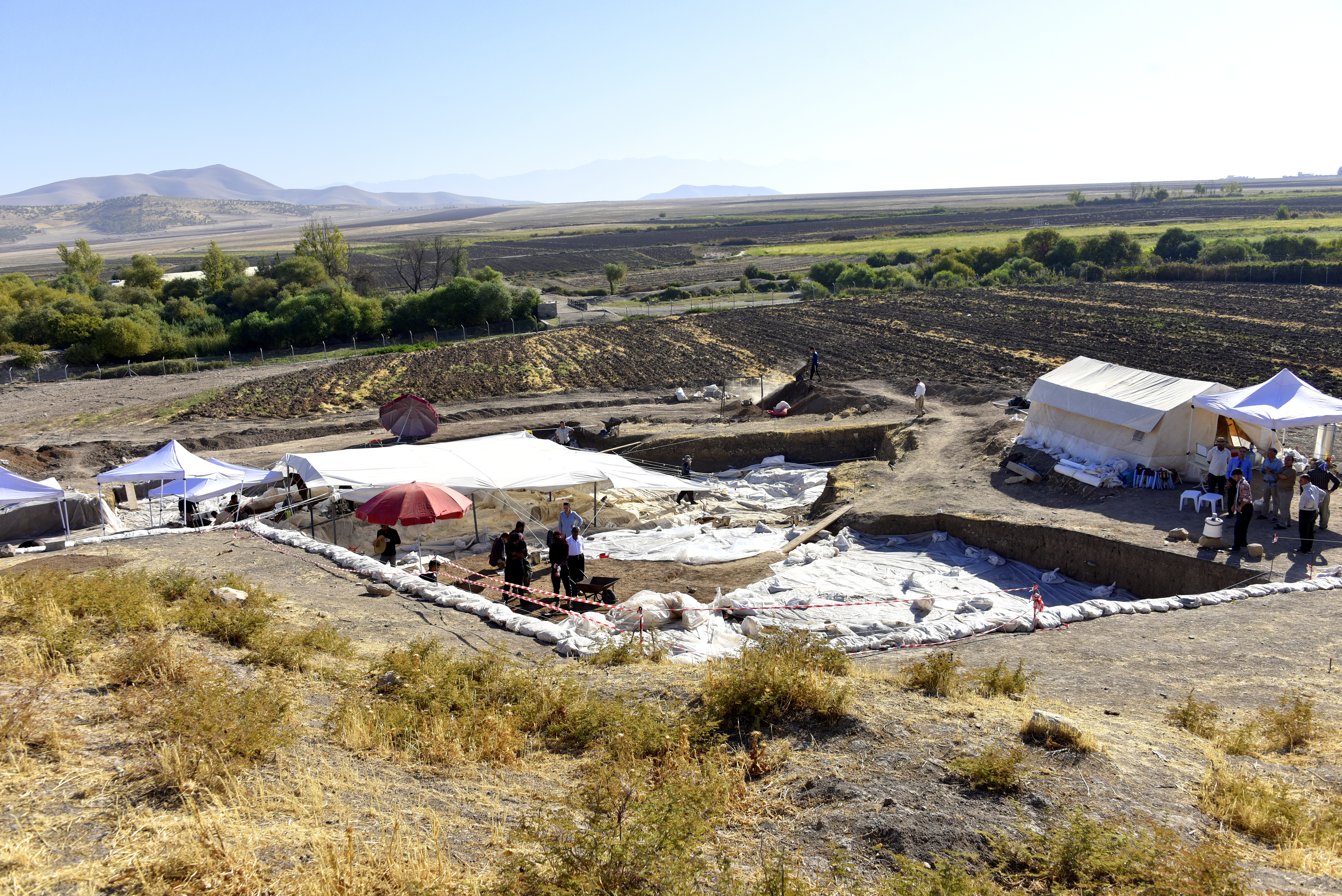
The Neolithic site of Bestansur at the Shahrizor Plain, Sulaymaniyah, Iraqi Kurdistan

Despite the evidence gathered from the lake coring expeditions, there is a lack of understanding of the evolution history of the Shahrizor Plain. The plain's climate, characterised by higher altitudes and increased precipitation, present differing environmental patterns in comparison to the general trends provided by the study of the lake cores.

The Pishdar and Rania plains, located in the hilly flanks region, have been the location of many archaeological expeditions involving excavations. Excavations at the sites of Bab-w-Kur in the Rania plain revealed the remains of “a series of large tripartite row houses and workshops, and a fortification wall that seems to surround parts of the lower mound.” This area is given the nickname the ‘Red Mudbrick Town’. Analysis of the excavations in this region, along with accompanying pottery remains, suggest these findings date back to the Late Chalcolithic Period.

Although there are ongoing archaeological projects and excavations, there have only been six archaeological sites of study in Iraqi Kurdistan, including Jarmo. The lower number of sites identified for the Early Neolithic Period in the Hilly Flanks region are explained by three primary reasons. First, morphogenesis may have taken place in the Northern Iraqi plain, resulting in the burial of sites by sedimentary deposits such as alluvium or colluvium. Second, evidence is difficult to locate on imagery, and the nature of their composition is that of fragile, fragmented material. Third, the sites have been destroyed from intensive agriculture in the region.

The political escalation of the mid-1970s in Iraq became an obstacle for researchers pursuing scientific studies in the hilly flanks region. Most archaeologists shifted their research to the adjacent Levant and Anatolia regions. In the late 2000s, archaeological excavations resumed in the Iraqi Kurdistan region as the political situation stabilised. Sites of the Neolithic period, including Bestansur in the Shahrizor Plain and Shimshara in the Rania Plain, were investigated to research methods of early farming.

=== Pottery ===
Pottery and clay innovation was a major aspect of creativity and practice in the hilly flanks. Archaeological findings have uncovered remains of pottery dating back to the Neolithic era. The earliest Neolithic pottery primarily consisted of tokens and figurines. The tokens are shaped as balls, cones, buttons, and ‘teardrops’. Figurines commonly depict reclining female individuals, usually with enlarged hips and thighs, which the culture viewed as a “sign of femininity.”

The creation of clay figurines provide insights into the activities carried out during that time. The female figurines are believed to have been used for education on female bodily development and implies a period of discovering their body and identity.

Ubaid pottery has been identified in Kall Karim, a region of the hilly flanks located between the Iraqi border and Kabir Kouh Mountains. Ubaid pottery is typically characterised by its black to brown, purple and dark green colours.

Additional excavations found Late Chalcolithic pottery in the Rania and Peshdar plains in Northern Iran. The distinct features of this pottery include neckless jars with inverted rims, double-rimmed jars, cannon spouts, globular holemouths and bowls with inwardly turned bevelled rims. The expedition found these characteristics to be similar to those of material uncovered in the Syrian Jazirah region and other locations in northwestern Iraq.

== Agriculture ==
The hilly flanks are largely believed to be the origins of agriculture, particularly the use of domestic animals and plants. Jarmo, an archaeological site in northeastern Iraq in the hilly flanks region, raised animals such as goats, sheep, pigs, and cattle, and harvested crops such as wheat, barley, and legumes.

Pig domestication occurred in the hilly flanks region, but discoveries found that there was an inconsistency in the pig management methods used throughout the region. Pig management had an early introduction in the Jarmo region, while it was introduced at a later stage in the Zagros region. The most likely explanation for the late arrival in different regions is the complex nature of the husbandry practices for managing pigs. Environmental factors and the existing agricultural practices put in place in particular societies may have inhibited the introduction of pig management.

Archaeological remains gathered by studies present evidence on the societal shift from hunting and gathering resources to producing food through agriculture and domesticating livestock. The first evidence of food resource management is believed to be dated back to the Upper Paleolithic Period. The early Holocene climate change is a major reason for the shift to agriculture and herding methods. The change in climate prompted the improvement of human skills, technological innovations, and food management techniques required for successful food production.

Excavations by the Joint Istanbul University-Chicago Oriental Institute Prehistoric Project studied an early-village farming site dating back to around 7000 B.C. called Cayönü in southeastern Turkey. The Project gathered resources to learn more about Cayönü, but placed an emphasis on the collection of data that provided insight on the domestication of plants and animals. Evidence across all excavations showed a shift from the dependence on big wild animals, such as aurochs and red deer, to the raising of domestic sheep and goats.

A noteworthy finding from the Joint Istanbul University-Chicago Oriental Institute Prehistoric Project was the low presence of grains and grain legumes. The researchers believe the poor preservation of the food plants in the upper levels may account for this diminished amount. The decline in traces of food plants may indicate a difference in dependency of food sources, from plant to animal.

Shahrizor, a wide valley in the hilly flanks region bordered by the Zagros Mountains in the northeast and the mountainous Surdash region in the northwest, is known for its agricultural history. Various weeds and cereal grasses, such as wild barley, continue to grow in non-cultivated soils of the region. Around 1957, an estimated 30% of the land was used for grain cultivation, while around 50% of the land was used for animal husbandry.

== See also ==
- History of agriculture
- History of Mesopotamia
