= Eolith =

Knapped flint nodule

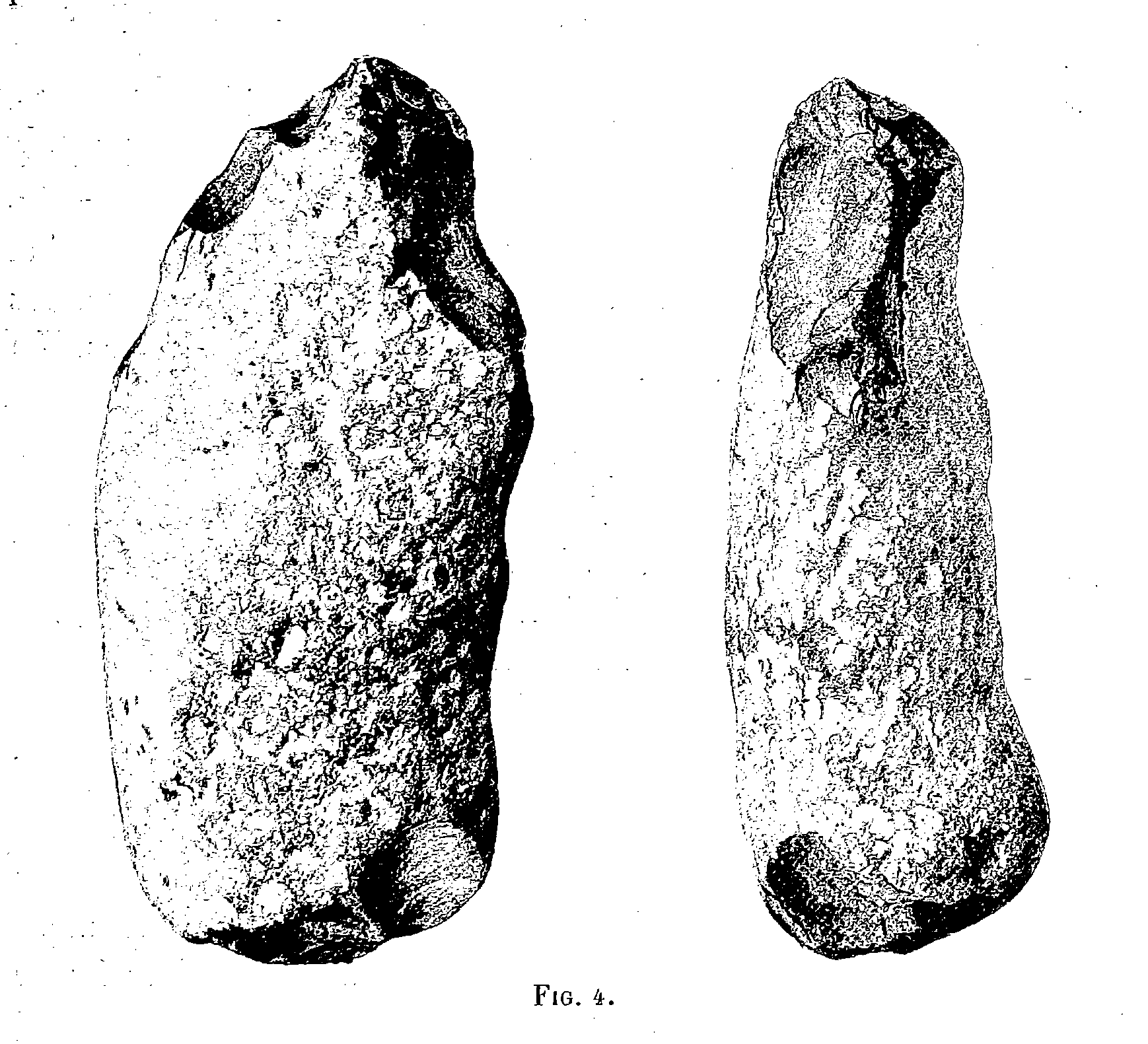
"Hammerstone" eolith, recognized to be of natural origin by Boule in 1905

An eolith (from Ancient Greek ἠώς (ēṓs), meaning "dawn", and λίθος (líthos), meaning "stone") is a flint nodule that appears to have been crudely knapped. Eoliths were once thought to have been artifacts, the earliest stone tools, but are now believed to be geofacts (stone fragments produced by fully natural geological processes such as glaciation).

The first eoliths were collected in Kent by Benjamin Harrison, an English amateur naturalist and archaeologist, in 1885 (though the name "eolith" was not coined until 1892, by J. Allen Browne). Harrison's discoveries were published by Sir Joseph Prestwich in 1891, and eoliths were generally accepted to have been crudely made tools, dating from the Pliocene (5.333 million to 2.58 million years ago). Further discoveries of eoliths in the early 20th century – in the Red Crag Formation and Norwich Crag Formation of East Anglia by J. Reid Moir and E. Ray Lankester and in continental Europe by Aimé Louis Rutot and H. Klaatsch – were taken to be evidence of human habitation of those areas before the oldest known fossils. The English finds helped to secure acceptance of the (hoax) remains of Piltdown Man.

Because eoliths were so crude, concern was raised that they were indistinguishable from the natural processes of erosion. Marcellin Boule, a French archaeologist, published an argument against the artefactual status of eoliths in 1905, and Samuel Hazzledine Warren provided confirmation of Boule's view after carrying out experiments on flints.

== Bibliography ==
- A. O'Connor, "Geology, archaeology, and ‘the raging vortex of the “eolith” controversy’", Proceedings of the Geologists' Association, 114 (2003).
- Terry Harrison, "Eoliths", in H. James Birx (editor), Encyclopedia of Anthropology (Sage, 2006).
- Roy Frank Ellen, "The Eolith Debate, Evolutionist Anthropology and the Oxford Connection Between 1880 and 1940," History and Anthropology, 22, 3 (2011), 277–306.
