= Nikolay Danilevsky =

Russian academic (1822–1885)

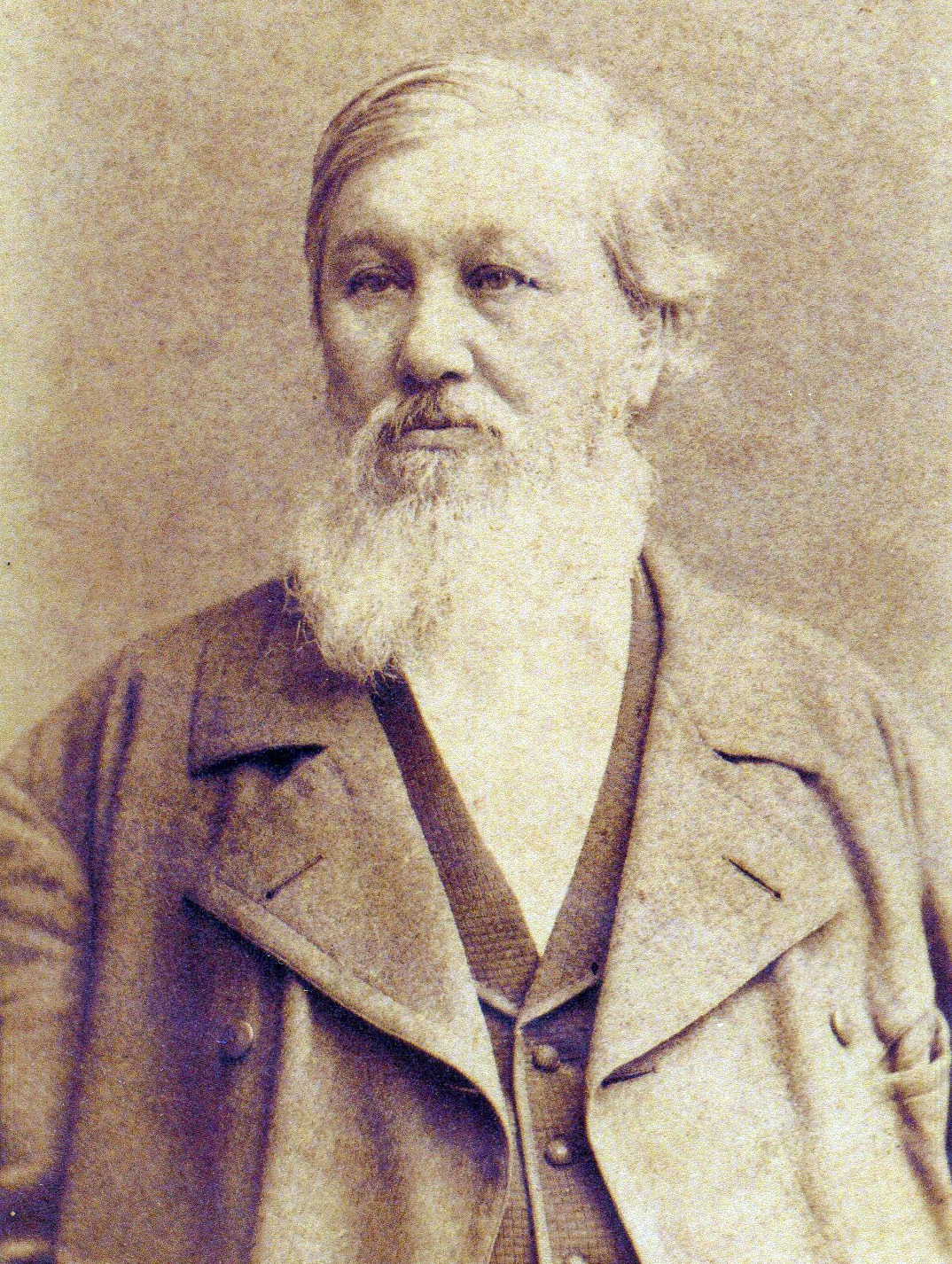
Nikolay Yakovlevich Danilevsky

Nikolay Yakovlevich Danilevsky (Russian: Николай Яковлевич Данилевский; 10 December [O.S. 28 November] 1822 – 19 November [O.S. 7 November] 1885) was a Russian naturalist, economist, ethnologist, philosopher, historian and ideologue of pan-Slavism and the Slavophile movement. He expounded a circular view of world history.

He is remembered also for his opposition to Charles Darwin's theory of evolution and for his theory of historical-cultural types.

== Life ==
Danilevsky was born in the village of Oberets in Oryol Governorate. As a member of a noble family, he was educated at the Tsarskoye Selo Lyceum. After graduation, he went on to an appointment with the Military Ministry Office. Dissatisfied with the prospect of a military career, he began to attend the University of St Petersburg, where he studied physics and mathematics.

Having passed his master's exams, Danilevsky prepared to defend his thesis on the flora of the Black Sea area of European Russia but in 1849 he was arrested there for his membership in the Petrashevsky Circle, which studied the work of French socialists and included Fyodor Dostoevsky. Its most active members were sentenced to death, later commuted to life imprisonment. Danilevsky was imprisoned for 100 days in the Peter and Paul Fortress and then was sent to live under police surveillance in Vologda, where he worked in provincial administration.

In 1852, he was appointed to an expedition, led by Karl Ernst von Baer, to assess the condition of the fishing industry on the Volga and the Caspian Sea. The expedition lasted four years, and Danilevsky was then reassigned to the Agricultural Department of the State Property Ministry. For over 20 years, he was responsible for expeditions to the White Sea, the Black Sea, the Azov Sea, the Caspian Sea and the Arctic Ocean. The expertise that he gained from the expeditions led to the publication of his 1872 book, Examination of Fishery Conditions in Russia.

Aside from his work on fisheries and the seal trade, he was the head of the commission setting the rules for the use of running water in Crimea from 1872 to 1879. He ran the Nikitsky Botanical Gardens from 1879 to 1880, and he was part of a commission appointed to deal with the phylloxera epidemic in the 1880s. His papers on Russian climatology, geology, geography, and ethnology earned him a gold medal from the Russian Geographical Society.

Danilevsky died in Tbilisi, Tiflis Governorate, and was buried at his estate, in Mshanka.

== Work ==
=== Natural theology and rejection of Darwinism ===
Danilevsky's Darwinism: Critical research, which brings together more than 1,200 pages of arguments against Darwin's theory, mostly assembled from the literature that already existed at the time, was published in 1885. It was meant to be the first volume of a longer work, the second volume containing Danilevsky's own theories, which he characterised as "natural theology", but it was unfinished at his death. When it was published posthumously, it contained only preliminary studies.

Danilevsky had been influenced by the work of von Baer, who had developed his own teleological theory of evolution and gone on to criticise Darwin's work in the 1870s. Danilevsky took from von Baer's theory the notion of Zielstrebigkeit. The German word means "singleness of purpose" but Danilevsky imbued it with a religious aspect and argued that evolution, as well as the original creation of the world, has a rational purpose and follows the will of a divine creator.

=== Theory of historical-cultural types ===
Danilevsky first published Russia and Europe: A Look at the Cultural and Political Relations of the Slavic World to the Romano-German World in the journal Zarya in 1869. Later republished as a monograph, it brought him international fame.

He pioneered the use of biological and morphological metaphors in the comparison of cultures. Danilevsky compared cultures and nations to biological species, denied their commonality and argued that each nation or civilisation is united by its language and culture, which it cannot pass on to any other nation. He thus characterised Peter the Great's reforms in Russia as doomed to failure, as they had attempted to impose alien values on the Slavic world.

Danilevsky distinguished four categories of historical-cultural activity:

1. religious
2. political
3. sociopolitical
4. cultural

They gave rise to ten historical-cultural types:

1. Chaldean
2. Hebrew
3. Arab
4. Indian
5. Persian
6. Greek
7. Roman or ancient Italian
8. Germanic
9. Hamitic or Egyptian
10. Chinese

Danilevsky applied his teleological theory of evolution by stating that each type went through various predetermined stages of youth, adulthood, and old age, the last being the end of that type. He characterised the Slavic type as being at the youth stage, and he developed a socio-political plan for its development, involving unification of the Slavic world, with its future capital at Constantinople (now Istanbul), ruled by an Orthodox emperor. While other cultures would degenerate in their blind struggle for existence, the Slavic world should be viewed as a Messiah among them. Danilevsky, however, believed that there is no genuine or absolute progress, as history is circular.

Aspects of Danilevsky's book prefigured some of the theories in Oswald Spengler's The Decline of the West. Arnold J. Toynbee mentions them in A Study of History. The Danilevsky hypothesis became the subject of much controversy and polarised its readers. On one hand, Fyodor Dostoyevsky and Leo Tolstoy praised it, but on the other hand, Occidentalists, such as Nikolai Kareev, Pavel Milyukov (1859-1943) and Nikolai Mikhailovsky (1842-1904), strongly opposed it. Czech statesman Tomáš Masaryk's book Russia and Europe (1913) is a critique of Danilevsky's book with the same title.

== See also ==
- List of Russian historians
- Social cycle theory

== Sources ==
- Eduard I. Kolcjinsky, "Nikolaj Jakovlevich Danilevsky", in Encyclopedia of Anthropology ed. H. James Birx (2006, SAGE Publications; ISBN 0-7619-3029-9)
- Macmaster, Robert E., "Danilevsky: A Russian Totalitarian Philosopher". (1967, Harvard University Press)
- (in Russian) Danilevsky Nikolai Yakovlevich. 1885-1889 Darwinism. A Critical Study (Дарвинизм. Критическое исследование) at Runivers.ru in DjVu format
- (in Russian) Danilevsky Nikolai Yakovlevich. 1895 Russia and Europe. A look at the cultural and political relations of the Slavic world to the German-Roman (Россия и Европа. Взгляд на культурные и политические отношения Славянского мира к Германо-Романскому)
- (in Russian) Danilevsky Nikolai Yakovlevich. 1890 Collection of political and economic articles (Сборник политических и экономических статей)
