= Frank Hole =

American archaeologist and prehistorian (born 1931)

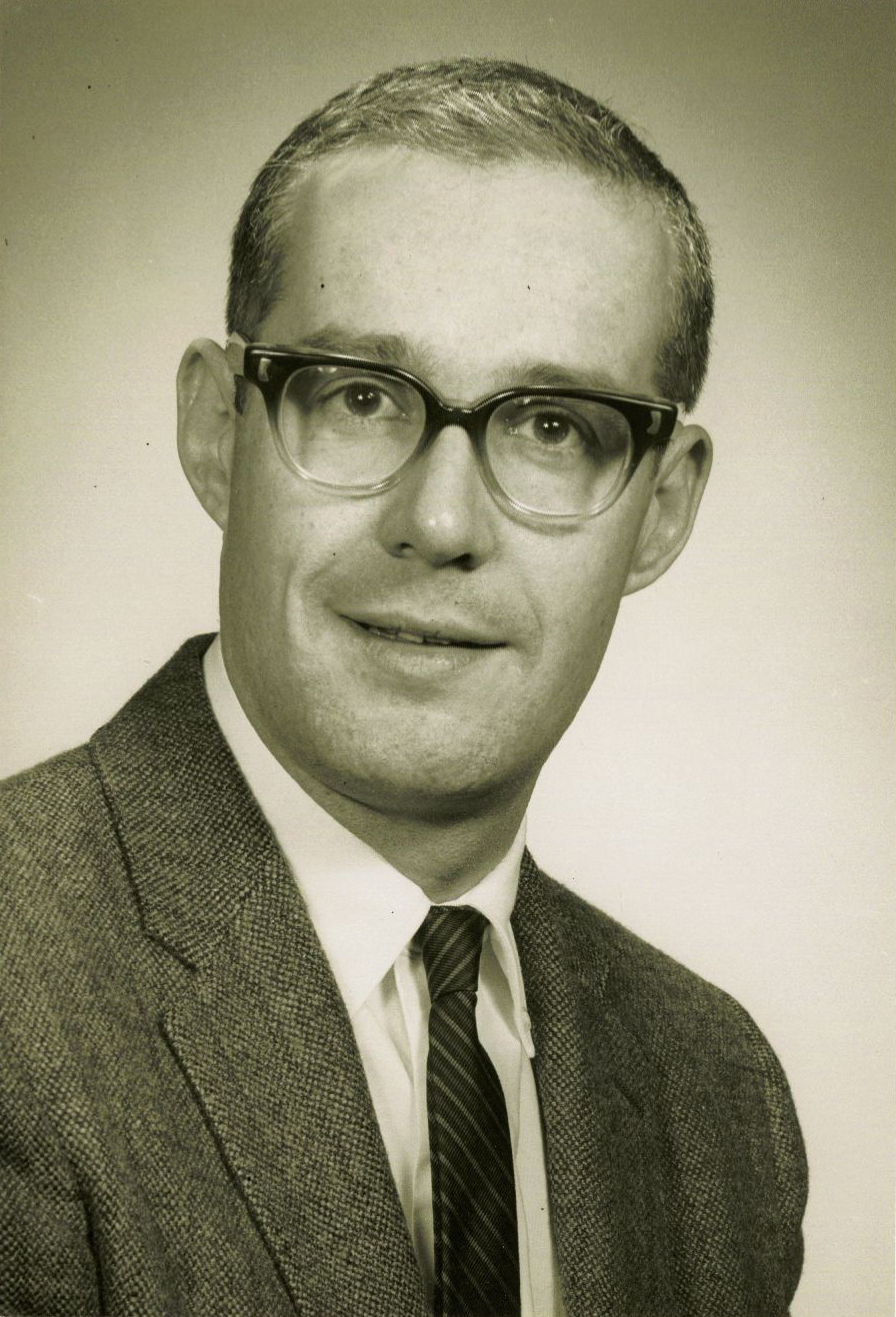

Academic background
- Education: Cornell College (BA, 1953); Harvard University (1957–58); University of Chicago (MA, 1958; PhD, 1961)
- Doctoral advisor: Robert Braidwood

Academic work
- Discipline: Anthropology
- Sub-discipline: Near Eastern archaeology; Landscape archaeology
- Institutions: Rice University (1961–1980); Yale University (1980–)

Frank Hole (born 1931) is an American Near Eastern archaeologist known for his work on the prehistory of Iran, the origins of food production, and the archaeology of pastoral nomadism. He is C. J. MacCurdy Professor Emeritus of Anthropology at Yale University.

== Education and career ==
Hole studied at Cornell College (BA, 1953), Harvard University (1957–58), and the University of Chicago (MA, 1958; PhD, 1961). He worked at Rice University from 1961 to 1980, and was a full professor from 1968. In 1980, he moved to Yale University, where he served as the C. J. MacCurdy Professor of Anthropology (1996–2005) and the head of the division of anthropology at the Peabody Museum (1996–2005). He retired in 2005 and was appointed a senior research scientist and professor emeritus. He has held visiting professorships at the University of Colorado (1971), Yale (1972–1973), and Masaryk University.

Hole was elected a Fellow of the American Association for the Advancement of Science in 1966, a member of the National Academy of Sciences in 1981, and a member of the Connecticut Academy of Science and Engineering in 1983. He received the 2007 lifetime achievement award from the Society for American Archaeology, and a Farabi International Award in 2011.

== Research on Iranian prehistory ==
At Chicago, Hole studied under Robert Braidwood, who was investigating the origins of food production in Southwest Asia. In 1959, when political instability prevented him from returning to his excavations at Jarmo in Iraqi Kurdistan, Braidwood began working across the border in the Iranian part of the Zagros Mountains. Hole joined Braidwood's team, which in 1959 conducted the first systematic surveys of early prehistory in Iran, in the region of Kermanshah, and the following year conducted excavations at Asiab, Sarab, and Warwasi. After this Braidwood moved on to southeastern Turkey, but Hole and another of his students, Kent Flannery, returned to work in western Iran.

Between 1961 and 1965, Hole and Flannery conducted a number of surveys in Lurestan and Khuzestan, and excavated at Gar Arjeneh, Yafteh, Pasangar, Ghamari, Kunji Cave, Ali Kosh, and (with James Neely) Tepe Sabz. These sites produced what was, at the time, some of the earliest evidence for the plant and animal domestication in the world.

He is also known for his pioneering work on the archaeology of pastoral nomads in the Near East, in particular his ethnoarchaeology of Luri pastoralists in western Iran.
