= Braidwood =

Braidwood may refer to:

== Places ==
- Braidwood, New South Wales, Australia
- Braidwood, South Lanarkshire, Scotland
  - Braidwood railway station
- Braidwood, Illinois, United States

== Other uses ==
- Braidwood (surname)
- Braidwood Inquiry, a 2008–2010 inquiry into a Taser incident in Vancouver, Canada
- Braidwood Nuclear Generating Station, Illinois, U.S.
- Braidwood, an abandoned Intel project, successor to Intel Turbo Memory
