= Braidwood (surname) =

Braidwood is a surname. Notable people with the surname include:

- Adam Braidwood (born 1984), Canadian football player
- Chuck Braidwood (1903–1945), American football player
- Ernie Braidwood (1895–1968), English footballer
- James Braidwood (1800–1861), Scottish firefighter
- Linda Braidwood (1909–2003), American archaeologist
- Phil Braidwood (born 1949), Manx politician
- Robert John Braidwood (1907–2003), American archaeologist and anthropologist
- Thomas Braidwood (1715–1806), founder of a school for the deaf in Scotland
- Thomas Braidwood Wilson (1792–1843), Australian surgeon and explorer
- Tom Braidwood (born 1948), Canadian actor
