= Bus Mordeh phase =

The Bus Mordeh phase is an archaeological phase in Khuzistan (Ali Kosh) that is roughly dated somewhere between 8,200 BCE and 7,000 BCE. Hunter gatherers were still active but agricultural settlement had also started with emmer, wheat and two-row hulled barley. These were cultivated crops, but wild barley was found with the domesticated variety. The principal crop was emmer; the clover-type legumes medicago (wild alfafa), astragalus (spiny milk vetch), and trigonella (pea family, related to fenugreek) were common crops, along with Oat grass (Avena), Bermuda grass (Cynodon) and canary grass (Phalaris).

From 7500 BCE - 6750 BCE, farmers in Khuzistan were heavily dependent on these wild legumes and native grasses. Over time, as wheat and barley cultivation expanded, wild grasses (which competed with the cultivated cereals for low salinity alluvial soils) were treated as weeds and removed. However Aegilops (goat-face grass), lolium (ryegrass) and other grasses from the mountains were introduced to the steppe (possibly from imperfectly processed grains) and some like ryegrass persist as weeds in this region into the modern day.

Cultivated cereals were harvested with flint sickles. These primitive grains were not free threshing cereals and so would be roasted until the chaff became brittle and ground with flat-topped pieces of rough limestone. The groats produced by this method were eaten as gruel. Herders tended sheep and goats in good grazing lands and thousands of flint blades have been found attesting to the well-established practice of hunting Persian gazelle, boar, wild ox and onager. Deh Luren was rich in water fowl, carp, mussels, terrapin, and catfish.
