= Robert John Braidwood =

American archaeologist and anthropologist

- Born: June 29, 1907; Detroit, Michigan
- Died: January 15, 2003 (aged 95); Chicago, Illinois
- Spouse: Linda Braidwood

Academic background
- Education: University of Michigan (MA, 1933); University of Chicago (PhD, 1943)
- Thesis: The comparative archaeology of early Syria: from the time of the earliest known village cultures through the Akkadian period. (1943)
- Doctoral advisor: James Henry Breasted

Academic work
- Discipline: Archaeology
- Sub-discipline: Near Eastern archaeology; Archaeological science
- Institutions: University of Chicago
- Doctoral students: Robert McCormick Adams Jr. Patty Jo Watson
- Notable students: Kent Flannery; Frank Hole

Robert John Braidwood (29 July 1907 – 15 January 2003) was an American archaeologist and anthropologist, one of the founders of scientific archaeology, and a leader in the field of Near Eastern Prehistory.

== Life ==
Braidwood was born July 29, 1907, in Detroit, Michigan, the first child of Walter John Braidwood (ca. 1876) and Reay Nimmo (1881), and was educated at the University of Michigan, from where he graduated with an M.A. in architecture in 1933. Within a year he had joined the University of Chicago Oriental Institute's expedition to the Amuq Plain with the archaeologist James Henry Breasted. He worked with the expedition until 1938, during which time he married fellow Michigan graduate Linda Schreiber, who became his partner in the field and in his research.

Braidwood spent World War II working for the Army Air Corps, in charge of a meteorological mapping program. In 1943 he gained his Ph.D. from the University of Chicago, who immediately employed him, and at whose Oriental Institute and Department of Anthropology he was a professor until he retired.

There is speculation that the fictional character Abner Ravenwood, from the Indiana Jones series, was based on Braidwood. Ravenwood was a fellow distinguished University of Chicago archaeologist known for his work in exotic locales and mentor to "Indy". Braidwood's colleague James Henry Breasted has been cited as a possible model for Indiana Jones

Robert John Braidwood died January 15, 2003, in Chicago. His wife Linda died the same day.

== Work ==
The expedition to the Amuq Plain (in the state of Hatay, Turkey) was one of the first scientific archaeological surveys, involving the rigorous dating of artifacts through careful mapping and record-keeping.

In 1947, Braidwood had learned about carbon dating from his Chicago colleague Willard Libby, and he began to use the method in order to make his dating of artifacts more precise. Also in 1947 the Oriental Institute's Jarmo Project in Iraq was launched by Braidwood. It was an early example of an excavation aiming to retrieve evidence of the methods of early food production and to solve the ecological problem of its origin and early consequences. The project brought together archaeologists, biologists, and geologists in a ground-breaking study which earned it a National Science Foundation grant in 1954 — one of the first times such an award had been made to an anthropological project. When the political situation in Iraq deteriorated, however, Braidwood was forced to leave, and he went on to carry out similar projects in Iran and Turkey.

Together with researchers from Istanbul University, Braidwood worked at a site in southern Turkey called Çayönü, and provided extensive and significance evidence for the theory that between 8,000 and 12,000 years ago there was a shift from a hunter-gatherer to an agricultural society in southern Turkey.

Braidwood is the author of "Prehistoric Men," a 181-page booklet in a series on popular topics published in 1967 by the Field Museum.

Braidwood was elected to the American Academy of Arts and Sciences in 1963, the United States National Academy of Sciences in 1964, and the American Philosophical Society in 1966. In 1971 the Archaeological Institute of America awarded him the Gold Medal Award for distinguished archaeological achievement.

== Works ==
- Robert J. Braidwood, "Mounds in the Plain of Antioch: An Archeological Survey", Oriental Institute Publications 48, Chicago: University of Chicago Press, 1937
- Robert J. Braidwood and Gordon R. Willey, ed. (1966). Courses Toward Urban Life. Chicago: Aldine Publishing Company – via Internet Archive.

== Sources and external links ==
- Stephen L. Brusatte, "Robert John Braidwood", in Encyclopedia of Anthropology ed. H. James Birx (2006, SAGE Publications; ISBN 0-7619-3029-9)
- University of Chicago obituary
- Photograph of the Amuq Plain expedition, 1936
- National Academy of Sciences Biographical Memoir
