= Bloomfield Central School District =

School district in New York, United States

Location
- East Bloomfield; United States

Other information
- Website: http://www.bloomfieldcsd.org/

The Bloomfield Central School District (also known as East Bloomfield School District) is a public school district in New York State, USA, that serves approximately 1101 students in 60 square miles (160 km^{2}) in the towns of Bloomfield, Victor, Bristol and others in Ontario County with a staff of ~150 and a budget of $17 million ($12969.69 per student).

The average class size is students (nice) (all grades). The student-teacher ratio is 16:1.

The superintendent of schools is Andrew Doel.

== Board of education ==
The Board of Education (BOE) consists of 6 members who serve rotating 3-year terms. Elections are held each May for board members and to vote on the School District Budget.

Current board members are:

- Pamela Nakoski, President
- James Spellman, Vice President
- Scott Layton
- Kenneth Mathis
- Caroline Nevil
- Tonya McFadden
- Heather Rickett

== Schools ==
The district operates two school buildings, a K-5 elementary school and 6-12 combined middle/high school in Bloomfield, New York.

=== Elementary schools ===
- Bloomfield Elementary School (PreK–5), Principal

=== Middle schools ===
- Bloomfield Middle School (6–8), Amanda Massters, Principal

=== High schools ===
- Bloomfield High School (9–12), Amy Shannon, Principal

== Performance ==
The district's 89% graduation rate exceeds the State Standard of 55%.

District sports teams have won New York State championships in Boys Soccer, Girls Volleyball, Girls Basketball, Girls Softball; Regional Championships in Boys Soccer, Girls Volleyball, Girls Basketball, Girls Soccer, Boys Basketball; and Sectional Championships in Girls track, Girls Bowling, Boys Bowling, Boys Soccer, Girls Volleyball, Girls Basketball, Girls Soccer, Boys Basketball.
