= Hallur =

Human settlement in India

- ಹಲ್ಲೂರು (Kannada)
- Location within India
- 14°19′48″N 75°37′12″E
- Periods: Chalcolithic
- Location: Haveri, Karnataka, India

Hallur is an archaeological site located in the Haveri district (which was carved out of Dharwad district), in the Indian state of Karnataka. Hallur, one of South India's earliest Iron Age sites, lies in a semi-arid region with scrub vegetation, located on the banks of the river Tungabhadra. The site is a small mound about 6.4 m high. The site was first discovered by Nagaraja Rao in 1962, and excavated in 1965. Further sampling was carried out in the late 1990s for the recovery of archaeobotanical evidence and new high precision radiocarbon dates

== Findings ==
The excavations at Hallur by Nagaraja Rao revealed two periods of occupation, Period I: Neolithic-Chalcolithic and Period II: An overlapping period between Neolithic-Chalcolithic and early Iron Age. Period I consisted of two sub-phases of human occupation dating between 2000 and 1200 BCE The transition to the Iron Age took place between 1200 and 1000 BCE. The original interpretation after the 1960s excavations was that Period II represented a new set of humans who arrived at this site with iron arrowheads, daggers and knives. Pottery in this period was generally black-and-red ware with lines and patterns in white drawn over them. More recent scholarship, however, argues for the indigenous cultural development from the Neolithic to the Iron Age and population continuity The iron found in this site was subjected to radiocarbon dating by Tata Institute of Fundamental Research and it was found that these iron objects belonged to about 1000 BCE This chronology has been supported by more recent AMS dating. This was contrary to the British archaeologist D. H. Gordon's theory that iron was not used in India prior to 250 BCE Further excavations by archaeozoologist K. R. Alur in 1971 led to the discovery of horse bones (Equus caballus Linn), which were dated to a period before the presumed Aryan migration. This discovery created a controversy since it countervened the common belief that horses were introduced into the southern parts of India only by the Aryans.

Archaeobotanical findings at Hallur indicated that the Neolithic staples consisted of browntop millet (Brachiaria ramosa), bristly foxtail (Setaria verticillata), mungbean, black gram, and horsegram. This site also produced some of the earliest evidence for crops of African origin in South India, including both hyacinth bean and pearl millet. In the later Iron Age period finger millet, kodo millet, and rice Ornaments made of carnelian, ceramic, gold and antler were also found. Apart from the bones of the horse; bones of cattle, sheep, goat and dog were found.

The housing structures found here consisted of circular floors, composed of schist chips and mud pounded hard to make a hard surface. The walls made of bamboo and mud, provided support to a conical thatched roof. One of the houses was found to have a circular fireplace containing ash and charcoal. The region below the floors was a burial chamber consisting of urns used for child burials. Chalcolithic blade tools of black quartzite, small copper axes and fish hooks were also found. The transition to the Iron Age period is marked by the presence of megaliths and iron implements.
