= Linda Braidwood =

American archaeologist

Linda Schreiber Braidwood
- Born: October 9, 1909; Grand Rapids, Michigan
- Died: January 15, 2003 (aged 93); Chicago, Illinois
- Education: University of Michigan; University of Chicago
- Spouse: Robert Braidwood
- Scientific career
- Fields: Archaeology

Linda Schreiber Braidwood (October 9, 1909 – January 15, 2003) was an American archaeologist and pre-historian. She and her husband Robert John Braidwood discovered the oldest known piece of cloth and some of the earliest known copper tools.
