= H. James Birx =

American anthropologist

Harry James Birx
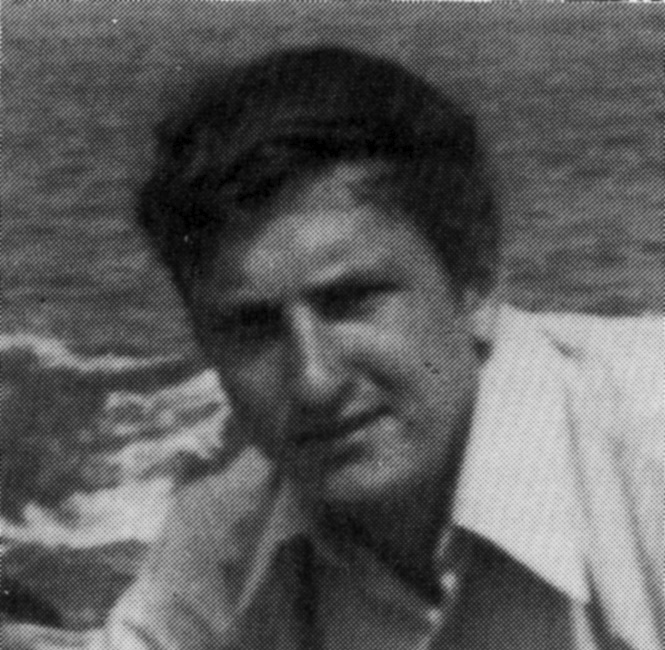
- Born: June 1, 1941 (age 85); Canandaigua, New York, U.S.
- Education: State University of New York at Geneseo; SUNY Buffalo
- Known for: Editor of Encyclopedia of Anthropology
- Awards: Professional Achievement Award from SUNY Geneseo (2003)
- Scientific career
- Fields: Anthropology, Philosophy
- Workplaces: Canisius College; State University of New York at Geneseo; University of Belgrade; Friedrich Schiller University of Jena; Harvard University

Harry James Birx (born June 1, 1941, in Canandaigua, New York), is an American anthropologist and a professor of anthropology at Canisius College in Buffalo, New York. He is a distinguished research scholar at the State University of New York at Geneseo.

== Life ==
Birx spent his childhood on the combination farm and travelers motel operated by his parents in the small town of Bloomfield in the Finger Lakes Region of New York. Graduating from Bloomfield Central High School in 1959, Birx completed his undergraduate studies at the nearby SUNY Geneseo before moving on to complete his M.A. in anthropology and his Ph.D. in philosophy, both from the SUNY Buffalo.

As of 2019, he currently serves as a full professor of anthropology at Canisius College, where he lectures on anthropology in film and early biological anthropology. He is also a distinguished research scholar in the SUNY Geneseo's Department of Anthropology and he regularly holds a winter semester course entitled "Human Culture and Evolution" for the doctoral program of the University of Belgrade in Serbia. He has been a visiting professor at the Friedrich Schiller University of Jena, twice a visiting scholar at Harvard University, and has lectured at universities around the world. He received the 2003 Professional Achievement Award from the State University of New York at Geneseo.

Birx has written eight books and edited six more, and is the editor of the five-volume Encyclopedia of Anthropology (2006). He is also the editor of the World Lecture Series in Anthropology.

== Honors ==
- Dr. H. James Birx Scholarship, State University of New York College of Arts and Sciences at Geneseo

== Books ==
- Theories of Evolution, Charles C Thomas Pub Ltd, 1984. ISBN 978-0398049027
- Craniometry of the Orchid Site Ossuary Buffalo, Persimmon Press, 1991. ISBN 0-9615462-5-5
- Interpreting Evolution, Prometheus Books, 1991. ISBN 0-87975-439-7
- Science and Society, Russian Academy of Sciences St. Petersburg, State University St. Petersburg, Russia, 2000
- Advances in Evolution & Paleontology, University of Zaragoza, Spain, 2001. ISBN 84-8465-079-0
- Values, Society & Evolution, Legend Books, 2002. ISBN 0-9657898-5-3

== Dissertation ==
- Pierre Teilhard de Chardin's Philosophy of Evolution, State University of New York at Buffalo, 1971. (author named as Birx, Harry James). 267 pages.
