= Encyclopedia of Anthropology =

Book of anthropology

- Cover page of the first edition
- Editor: H. James Birx
- Publication date: 2006

The Encyclopedia of Anthropology is an encyclopedia of anthropology edited by H. James Birx of Canisius College and SUNY Geneseo.

The encyclopedia, published in 2006 by SAGE Publications, is in five volumes, and contains over 1,200 articles by more than 300 contributors. Entries include the main people, concepts, and theories, in anthropology, but also relevant topics from other disciplines, such as politics, psychology, linguistics, philosophy, and archaeology.

== Sources and external links ==
- H. James Birx [ed.] Encyclopedia of Anthropology (2006, SAGE Publications; ISBN 0-7619-3029-9)
- Reader's Guide — list of entries (PDF)
