= Trialetian Mesolithic =

Upper Paleolithic-Epipaleolithic stone tool industry

Trialetian culture
- Period: Mesolithic
- Dates: c. 16/13000 – c. 8000 BP
- Major sites: Trialeti, Shanidar Cave, Huto and Kamarband Caves, Kotias Klde, Chokh
- Preceded by: Baradostian culture
- Followed by: Shulaveri-Shomu culture

Trialetian is the name for an Upper Paleolithic-Epipaleolithic stone tool industry from the South Caucasus. It is tentatively dated to the period between 16,000 / 13,000 BP and 8,000 BP.

== Archaeology ==
The name of the archaeological culture derives from sites in the district of Trialeti in south Georgian Khrami river basin. These sites include Barmaksyzkaya and Edzani-Zurtaketi. In Edzani, an Upper Paleolithic site, a significant percentage of the artifacts are made of obsidian.

The Caucasian-Anatolian area of Trialetian culture was adjacent to the Iraqi-Iranian Zarzian culture to the east and south as well as the Levantine Natufian to the southwest. Alan H. Simmons describes the culture as "very poorly documented". In contrast, recent excavations in the Valley of Qvirila river, to the north of the Trialetian region, display a Mesolithic culture. The subsistence of these groups were based on hunting Capra caucasica, wild boar and brown bear.

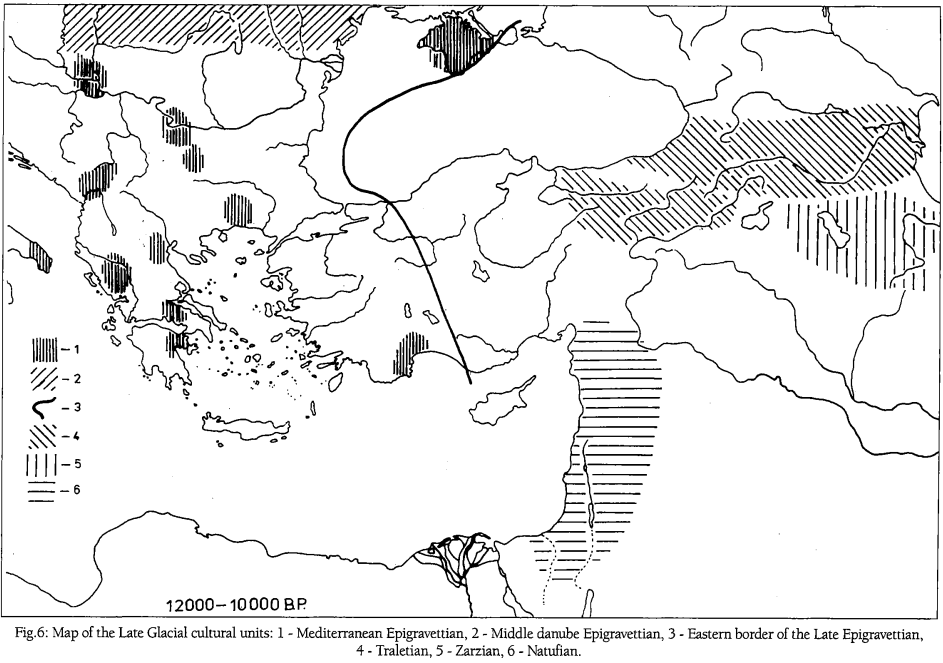
Distribution of the Trialetian according to Kozłowski and Kaczanowska (2004)

=== Trialetian sites ===
Caucasus and Transcaucasia:

- Edzani (Georgia)
- Chokh (Azerbaijan), layers E-C200
- Kotias Klde, layer B

Eastern Anatolia:

- Hallan Çemi (from ca. 8.6-8.5k BC to 7.6-7.5k BC)
- Nevali Çori shows some Trialetian admixture in a PPNB context

Trialetian influences can also be found in:

- Cafer Höyük
- Boy Tepe

Southeast of the Caspian Sea:

- Hotu (Iran)
- Ali Tepe (Iran)(from cal. 10.5k BC to 8.87 BC)
- Belt Cave (Iran), layers 28-11 (the last remains date from ca. 6k BC)
- Dam-Dam-Cheshme II (Turkmenistan), layers7-3

The belonging of these Caspian Mesolithic sites to the Trialetian has been questioned.

=== Relation with the Caspian Mesolithic ===
Differences have been found between the Trialetian and the Caspian Mesolithic of the southeastern part of the Caspian Sea (represented by sites like Komishan, Hotu, Kamarband and Ali Tepe), even though the Caspian Mesolithic had previously been attributed to Trialetian by Kozłowski (1994, 1996 and 1999), Kozłowski and Aurenche 2005 and Peregrine and Ember 2002. These differences have been established through a detailed study of the site of Komishan and are driven by the underlying differences at the level of cultural ecology.

While Trialetian industry developed in steppe riparian and mountain ecozones, as for example in the Khrami river and the mountainous site of Chokh respectively, the Caspian Mesolithic took place in a transitional ecotone between the sea (Caspian Sea), plain and mountains (Alborz mountain range). The Caspian Mesolithic hunter-gatherers were adapted to the exploitation of marine resources and had access to high quality raw material, whereas in the Trialetian sites as Chokh and Trialeti there is imported raw material from distances of 100 km.

=== Relation with Kmlo-2 ===
Kmlo-2 is a rock shelter situated on the west slope of the Kasakh River valley, on the Aragats massif, in Armenia. This site seems to present three different phases of occupation (11-10k cal BC, 9-8k cal BC and 6-5k cal BC). The lithic industry of the three phases show similarities such as the predominance of microliths, small cores and obsidian as raw material. The backed an scalene bladelets are the dominant type of microlith; these tools show similarities with those of the Late Upper Paleolithic of Kalavan-1 and the Mesolithic layer B of the Kotias Klde. Cultural affinities of the Kmlo-2 lithic industry with the Epipaleolithic and Aceramic Neolithic sites in Taurus-Zagros mountains have also been noted.

Let us quote a few words from Gasparyan about the industry found in Apnagyugh-8 (Kmlo-2) cave that express these similarities:

Let us conclude that Apnagyugh-8 industry is closer to the production complexes with traditions of Mesolithic and/or Upper Paleolithic periods. But it’s difficult to show any culture or archaeological source in Armenia today, which belongs to these periods, preceding Apnagyugh-8 and could have been its origin or prototype. The only site that emerged before Apnagyugh-8 is Kalavan-1, an Upper Paleolithic site dating to 16th–14th millennia B.C., where microliths of geometrical forms are fully absent. Though Apnagyugh-8 industry shows some similarities with Zarzian and Trialeti cultures, analytic studies for proving this comparison are still in the process.

Layer III of Kmlo-2 contained the so-called “Kmlo tools”. Kmlo tools are characterized by "continuous and parallel retouch by pressure flaking of one or both lateral edges". Similar tools have been found, as the associated to the Paluri-Nagutny culture in Georgia), the so-called "Çayönü tools” (Çayönü, Cafer Höyük, Shimshara), found in Neolithic sites from the 8th to 7th millennia BC in eastern Anatolia and northern Mesopotamia, and some found in the layer A2 of the Kotias Klde cave. It has been suggested that the Kmlo tools are distinctive features of a culture established circa 9-8k cal BC on the highlands of western Armenia and continued at least until the 6th-5th millennia calBC. A local development of the Kmlo tools has also been hypothesized.

=== Final phase ===
Little is known about the end of the Trialetian. 6k BC has been proposed as the time on which the decline phase took place. From this date are the first evidence of the Jeitunian, an industry that has probably evolved from the Trialetian. Also from this date are the first pieces of evidence of Neolithic materials in the Belt cave.

In the southwest corner of the Trialetian region it has been proposed that this culture evolved towards a local version of the PPNB around 7k BC, in sites as Cafer Höyük.

Kozłowski suggests that the Trialetian does not seem to have continuation in the Neolithic of Georgia (as for example in Paluri and Kobuleti). Although in the 5k BC certain microliths similar to those of the Trialetian reappear in Shulaveris Gora (see Shulaveri-Shomu) and Irmis Gora.

Fertile Crescent circa 7500 BC, with main sites of the Pre-Pottery Neolithic period. In this map we can see some sites that have been associated with the Trialetian culture, such as Hallan Çemi and Nevali Çori.

== Genetics ==
The genome of a Mesolithic hunter-gatherer individual found at the layer A2 of the Kotias Klde rock shelter in Georgia (labeled KK1), dating from 9,700 BP, has been analysed. This individual forms a genetic cluster with another hunter-gatherer from the Satsurblia Cave, the so-called Caucasian Hunter-Gatherer (CHG) cluster. KK1 belongs to the Y-chromosome haplogroup J2a and mitochondrial haplogroup H13c (an independent analysis has assigned him J2a1b-Y12379*).

Although the belonging of the Caspian Mesolithic to the Trialetian has been questioned, genetic similarities have been found between a Mesolithic hunther-gatherer from the Hotu cave (labeled Iran_HotuIIIb) dating from 9,100-8,600 BCE and the CHG from Kotias Klde. The Iran_HotuIIIb individual belongs to the Y-chromosome haplogroup J (xJ2a1b3, J2b2a1a1) (an independent analysis yields J2a-CTS1085(xCTS11251,PF5073) -probably J2a2-). Then, both KK1 and Iran_HotuIIIb individuals share a paternal ancestor that lived approximately 18.7k years ago (according to the estimates of yfull). At the autosomal level it falls in the cluster of the CHG's and the Iranian Neolithic Farmers.

== See also ==
- Mesolithic
- Epipaleolithic Near East
- Prehistoric Caucasus
- Prehistoric Georgia
- Prehistory of Iran
- Zarzian culture
- Natufian culture
- Caucasian Hunter-Gatherer

== Literature ==
- Stefan Karol Kozłowski: The Trialetian “Mesolithic” industry of the Caucasus, Transcaspia, Eastern Anatolia, and the Iranian Plateau. In: Stefan Karol Kozłowski, Hans Georg Gebel (ed.): Neolithic chipped stone industries of the Fertile Crescent, and their contemporaries in adjacent regions., Studies in Early Near Eastern Production, Subsistence and Environment 3, Berlin 1996, pg. 161–170.
- Sagona, A. (2017). The Archaeology of the Caucasus: From Earliest Settlements to the Iron Age (Cambridge World Archaeology). Cambridge: Cambridge University Press. doi:10.1017/9781139061254
- Olivier Aurenche, Philippe Galet, Emmanuelle Régagnon-Caroline, Jacques Évin: Proto-Neolithic and Neolithic Cultures in the Middle East – the Birth of Agriculture, Livestock Raising, and Ceramics: A Calibrated 14C Chronology 12, 500-5500 cal BC, in: Near East Chronology: Archaeology and Environment. Radiocarbon 43,3 (2001) 1191–1202. (online, PDF)
