= Neve David =

Epipalaeolithic archaeological site in Mount Carmel

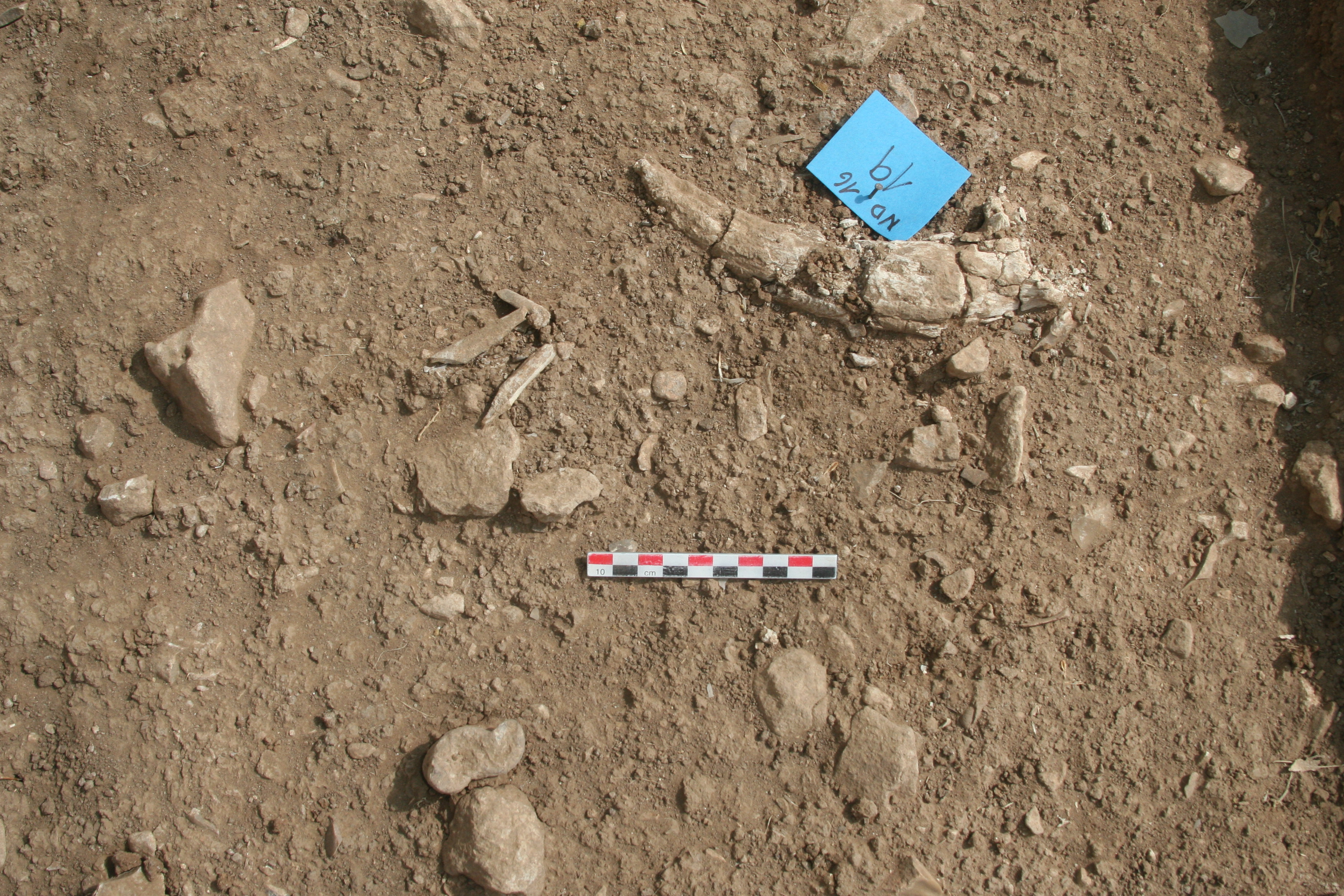
Gazelle horn exposed at Neve David on Mount Carmel, Israel

Neve David is an Epipalaeolithic archaeological site located at the foot of the western slope of the Mount Carmel hills in northern Israel. It was inhabited in the later part of the Middle Epipalaeolithic, about 15,000–13,000 BC.

Today, the Neve David site is just about 1 km (0.62 mi) from the Mediterranean coastline, but in the final Pleistocene, it was 10–13 km (6.2–8.1 mi) from the shore, overlooking a broad coastal plain. It was thus situated at an ecotone, the boundary between two contrasting ecological zones, with the seasonally dry valleys of the Mount Carmel limestone massif to its east, and the Mediterranean coastal plain to its west. Such locations with access to two complementing ecological resources were favoured by many Epipaleolithic and Neolithic communities.

== Settlement ==
At c. 1000 square meters, Neve David was one of the larger settlements of its time, and the thickness of its archaeological deposit layer of about 1 m (3 ft 3 in) indicates that it was occupied repeatedly over a long period. Being an open-air site, the good preservation of its remains implies the implementation of solid structures of soil and clay. It yielded large quantities of ground-stone implements, most made of local limestone, but some also of black basalt brought there from some distance.

The faunal remains found at Neve David comprised 15 mammal species, two reptile species and seven genera of molluscs. Bone fractures, cut marks and burned bones reflect human activity. The major prey species were gazelle and fallow deer (60% and 30%, respectively), comparable to many other Epipalaeolithic sites from Israel.

== Cultural traits ==
Two burials have been found at the Neve David site. One of these contained the remains of a 23- to 30-year-old male, who was interred in a grave pit lined with stone slabs. Over his head, a stone mortar was placed upside-down, and a part of a broken basalt bowl was found behind his neck. Between his thighs, pieces of a flat basalt grinding slab were laid. The careful construction of the grave and the grave offerings presage later Natufian burials.

The inhabitants of Neve David were still hunter-gatherers, no signs of agriculture or animal domestication have been found there.
