= Epipalaeolithic Near East =

Epipalaeolithic Near East

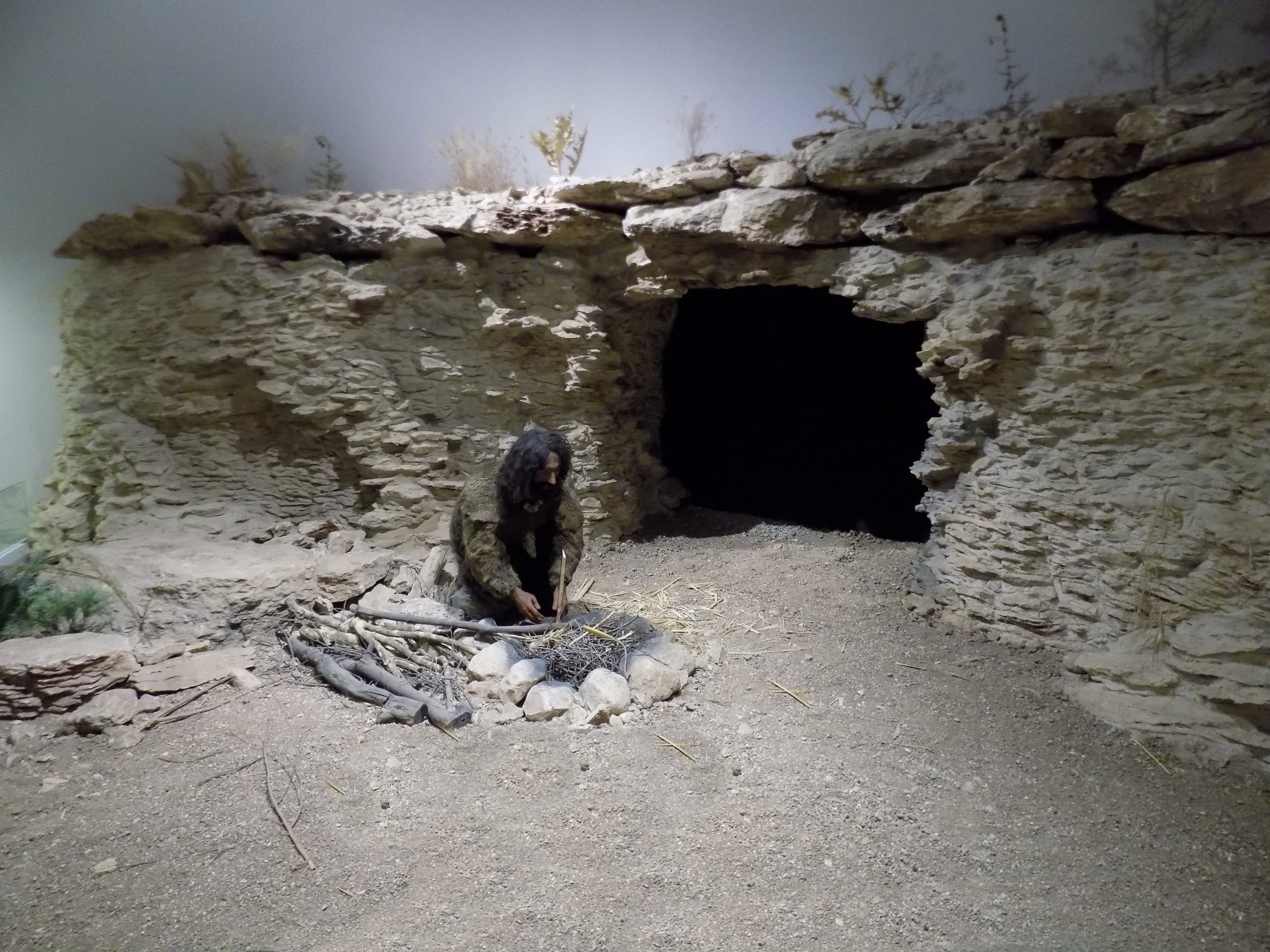
Reconstruction of Near East Paleolithic cave shelter. Şanlıurfa Museum, Turkey.

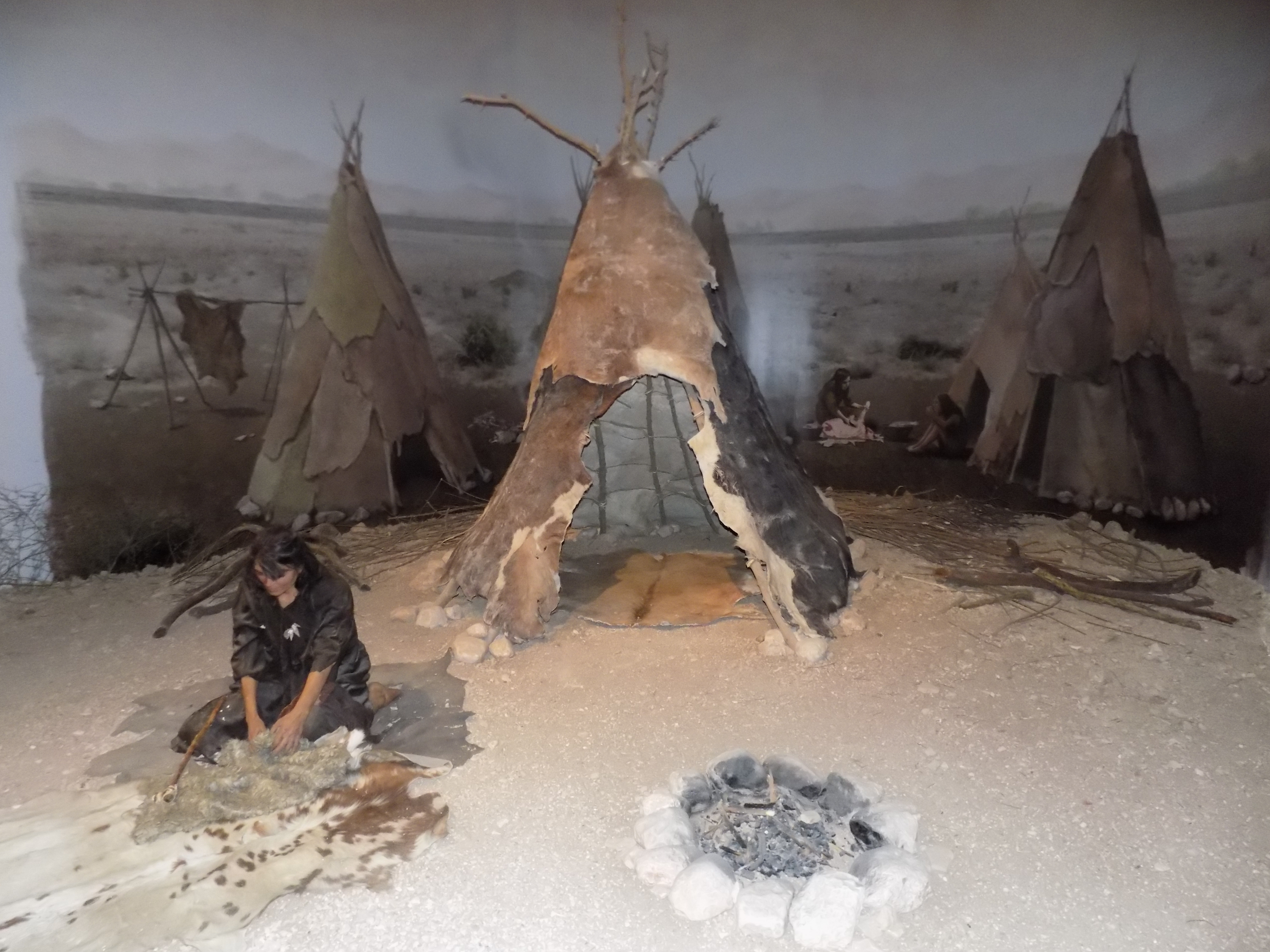
Reconstruction of Epipalaeolithic temporary tents. Şanlıurfa Museum.

Prehistoric Southwest Asia
Axis scale is years Before Present

The Epipalaeolithic Near East designates the Epipalaeolithic ("Final Old Stone Age") in the prehistory of the Near East. It is the period after the Upper Palaeolithic and before the Neolithic, between approximately 25,000 and 11,500 years Before Present. The people of the Epipalaeolithic were nomadic hunter-gatherers who generally lived in small, seasonal camps rather than permanent villages. They made sophisticated stone tools using microliths—small, finely-produced blades that were hafted in wooden implements. These are the primary artifacts by which archaeologists recognise and classify Epipalaeolithic sites.

Although the appearance of microliths is an arbitrary boundary, the Epipalaeolithic does differ significantly from the preceding Upper Palaeolithic. Epipalaeolithic sites are more numerous, better preserved, and can be accurately radiocarbon dated. The period coincides with the gradual retreat of glacial climatic conditions between the Last Glacial Maximum and the start of the Holocene, and it is characterised by population growth and economic intensification. The Epipalaeolithic ended with the "Neolithic Revolution" and the onset of domestication, food production, and sedentism, although archaeologists now recognise that these trends began in the Epipalaeolithic.

The period is subdivided into Early (c. 25,000–19,000 BP), Middle (19,000–15,000 BP) and Late (15,000–11,500 BP) phases. In the Mediterranean Levant, the Early Epipalaeolithic is characterised by the Kebaran culture, the Middle Epipalaeolithic by the Geometric Kebaran culture, and the Late Epipalaeolithic by the Natufian culture. In Mesopotamia, the Zagros, and the Iranian plateau, the entire period is associated with the Zarzian culture. The Epipalaeolithic of Anatolia is relatively poorly documented but displays cultural similarities to both the Levantine Epipalaeolithic and Aegean Mesolithic. With a few exceptions that resemble the Geometric Kebaran, the Arabian Peninsula is thought to have been largely uninhabitable during this period.

== Levant ==
=== Early Epipalaeolithic ===
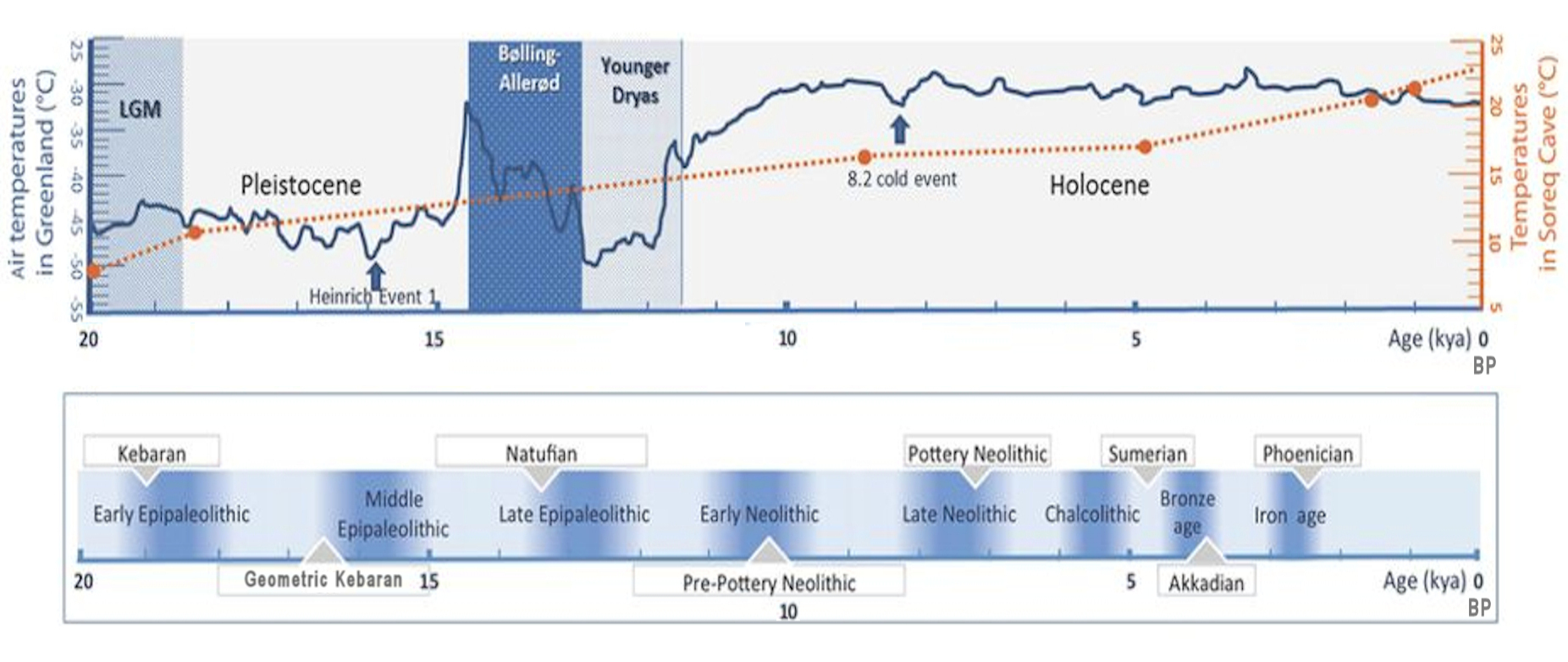
The Epipalaeolithic corresponds to the first period of progressive warming after the Last Glacial Maximum (LGM), before the start of the Holocene and the onset of the Neolithic Revolution. The change in temperatures in the Post-Glacial period is based on evidence from Greenland ice cores.

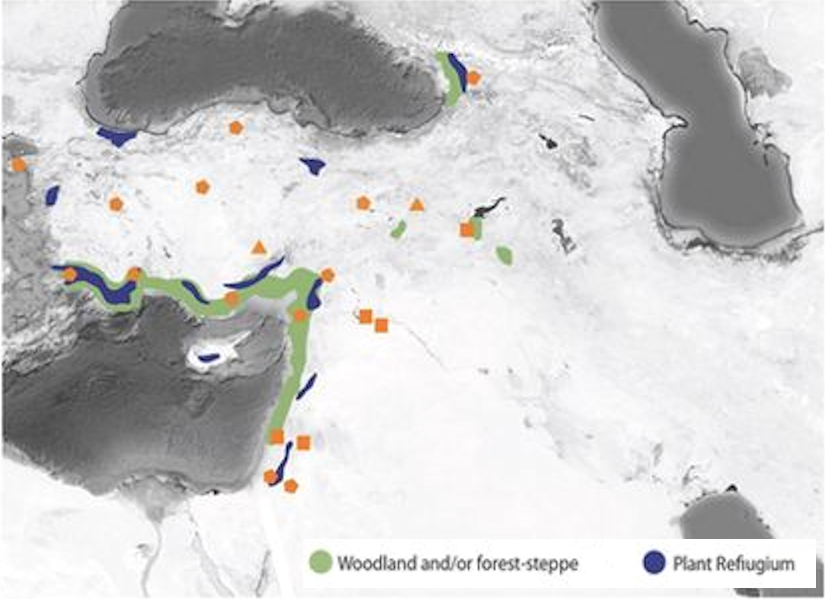
Archaeological evidence of human activities in the Near East, at the end of the Upper Paleolithic and during the Epipalaeolithic. Human occupation signs 29–15.2 ka (diamonds), wood charcoal (nuts) 15.9–11.2 ka (squares).

The Early Epipalaeolithic, also known as the Kebaran culture, lasted from 20,000 to 12,150 BP. It followed the Levantine Aurignacian, formerly called the "Antelian period", throughout the Levant. By the end of the Levantine Aurignacian, gradual changes occurred in stone industries. Small stone tools called microliths and retouched bladelets can be found for the first time. The microliths of this culture period differ markedly from the Aurignacian artifacts.

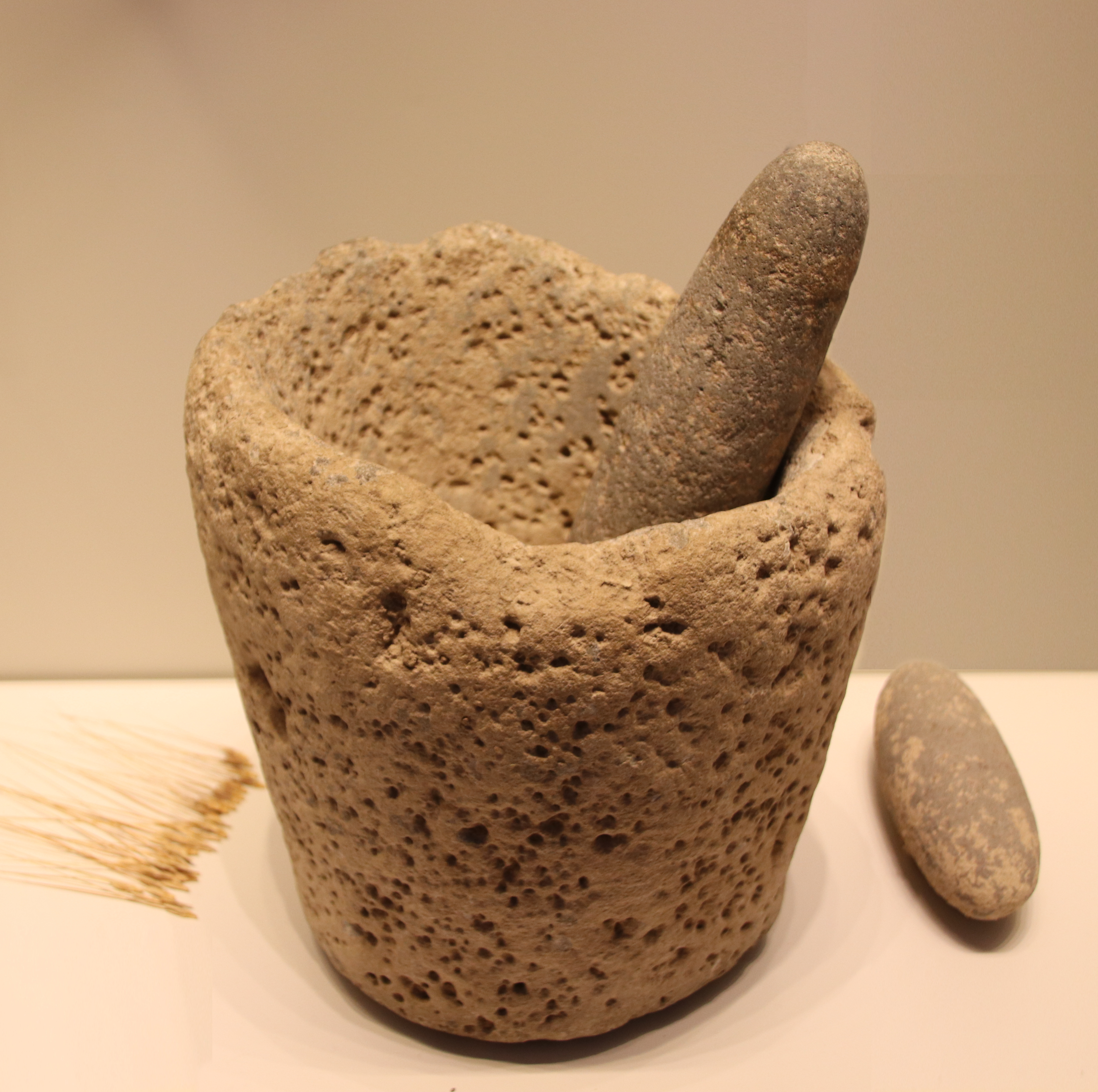
Stone Age stone mortar and pestle, Kebaran culture, 22000-18000 BP

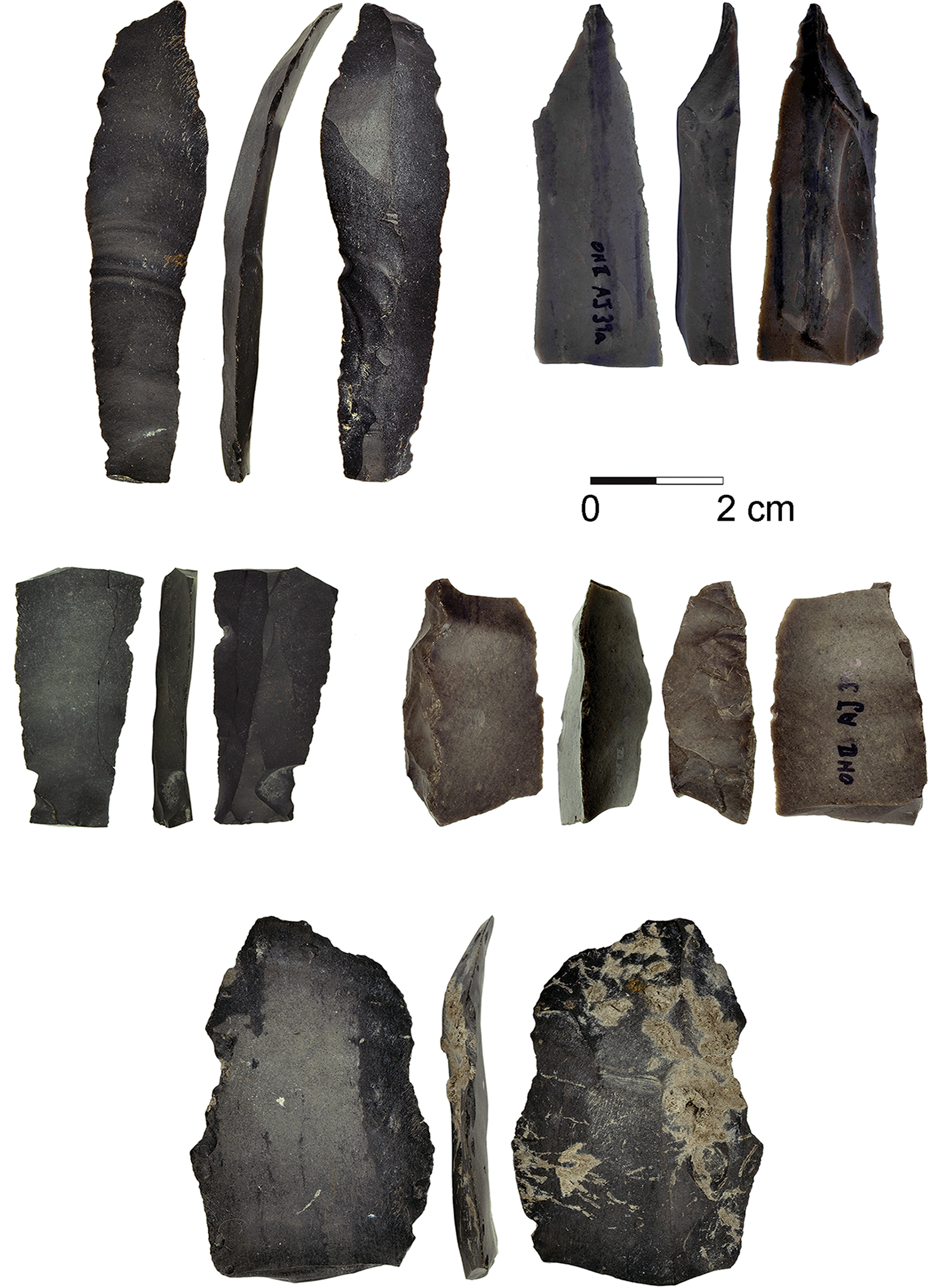
Composite sickles for cereal harvesting at 23,000-Years-Old Ohalo II, Israel.

By 18,000 BP, the climate and environment had changed and a transition period had started. The Levant became more arid, and the forest vegetation retreated to be replaced by steppes. The cool and dry period ended at the beginning of Mesolithic 1. The hunter-gatherers of the Aurignacian would have had to modify their way of living and their pattern of settlement to adapt to the changing conditions. The crystallization of these new patterns resulted in Mesolithic 1. The people developed new types of settlements and new stone industries.

The inhabitants of a small Mesolithic 1 site in the Levant left little more than their chipped stone tools behind. The industry was small tools made of bladelets struck off single-platform cores. Besides bladelets, burins and end-scrapers have been found. A few bone tools and some ground stones have also been found. These so-called Mesolithic sites of Asia are far less numerous than those of the Neolithic, and the archeological remains are very poor.

The type site is Kebara Cave south of Haifa. The Kebaran was characterized by small, geometric microliths. The people were thought to lack the specialized grinders and pounders in later Near Eastern cultures. The Kebaran is preceded by the Athlitian phase of the Levantine Aurignacian and followed by the proto-agrarian Natufian culture of the Epipalaeolithic. The appearance of the Kebaran culture of microlithic type implies a significant rupture in the cultural continuity of the local Upper Paleolithic. The Kebaran culture, with its use of microliths, is also associated with the use of the bow and arrow and the domestication of the dog. The Kebaran is also characterised by the earliest collecting and processing of wild cereals, known due to the excavation of grain-grinding tools. This was the first step towards the Neolithic Revolution. The Kebaran people are believed to have migrated seasonally, dispersing to upland environments in the summer, and gathering in caves and rock shelters near lowland lakes in the winter. This diversity of environments may be the reason for the variety of tools in their toolkits.

The Kebaran is generally considered ancestral to the later Natufian culture, which occupied much of the same range.

==== Harvesting of cereals ====
The earliest evidence for the use of composite cereal harvesting tools are the glossed flint blades that have been found at the site of Ohalo II, a 23,000-year-old fisher-hunter-gatherers' camp on the shore of the Sea of Galilee, Northern Israel. The Ohalo site is dated at the junction of the Upper Paleolithic and the Early Epipalaeolithic, and has been attributed to both periods. The wear traces on the tools indicate that these were used for harvesting near-ripe, semi-green wild cereals, shortly before grains ripen enough to disperse naturally. The study shows that the tools were not used intensively, and they reflect two harvesting modes: flint knives held by hand and inserts hafted into a handle. The finds reveal the existence of cereal harvesting techniques and tools some 8000 years before the Natufian and 12,000 years before the establishment of sedentary farming communities in the Near East during the Neolithic Revolution. Furthermore, the new finds accord well with evidence for the earliest ever cereal cultivation at the site, and for the use of stone-made grinding implements.

==== Artistic expression in the Kebaran culture ====
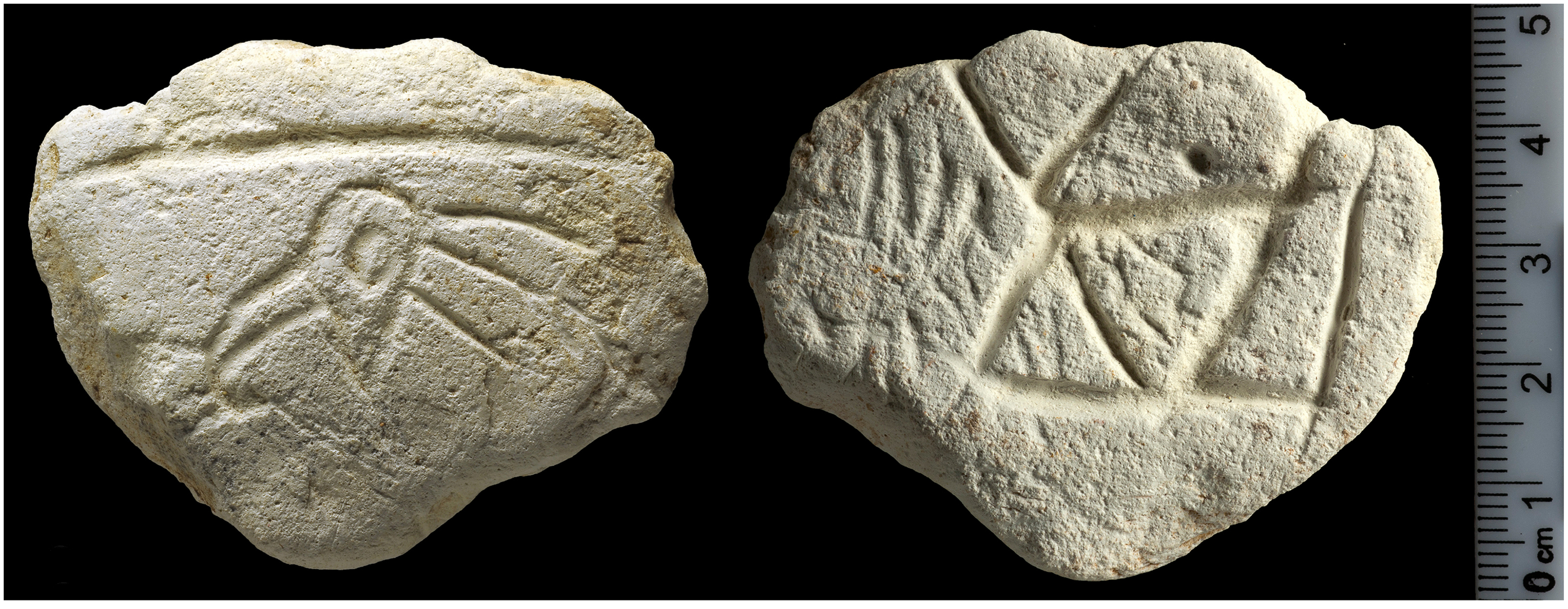
Engraved plaquette with bird image from Ein Qashish South, Jezreel Valley, Northern District of Israel, Kebaran and Geometric Kebaran ca. 23,000-16,500 BP.

Evidence for symbolic behavior of Late Pleistocene foragers in the Levant has been found in engraved limestone plaquettes from the Epipalaeolithic open-air site Ein Qashish South in the Jezreel Valley of the Northern District of Israel. The engravings were uncovered in Kebaran and Geometric Kebaran deposits (ca. 23,000 and ca. 16,500 BP), and include the image of a bird, the first figurative representation known so far from a pre-Natufian Epipalaeolithic site, together with geometric motifs such as chevrons, cross-hatchings, and ladders. Some of the engravings closely resemble roughly contemporary European finds and may be interpreted as "systems of notations" or "artificial memory systems" related to the timing of seasonal resources and related important events for nomadic groups.

Similar-looking signs and patterns are well known from the context of the local Natufian, a final Epipalaeolithic period when sedentary or semi-sedentary foragers started practicing agriculture.

=== Late Epipalaeolithic ===
The Late Epipalaeolithic is also called the Natufian culture. This period is characterized by the early rise of agriculture, which later emerged more fully in the Neolithic period. Radiocarbon dating places the Natufian culture between 12,500 and 9500 BCE, just before the end of the Pleistocene. This period is characterised by the beginning of agriculture.

The Natufian culture is commonly split into two subperiods: Early Natufian (12,500–10,800 BCE) (Christopher Delage gives c. 13,000–11,500 BP uncalibrated, equivalent to c. 13,700–11,500 BCE) and Late Natufian (10,800–9500 BCE). The Late Natufian most likely occurred in tandem with the Younger Dryas. The following period is often called the Pre-Pottery Neolithic and includes the Khiamian culture (9700 to 8600 BCE).

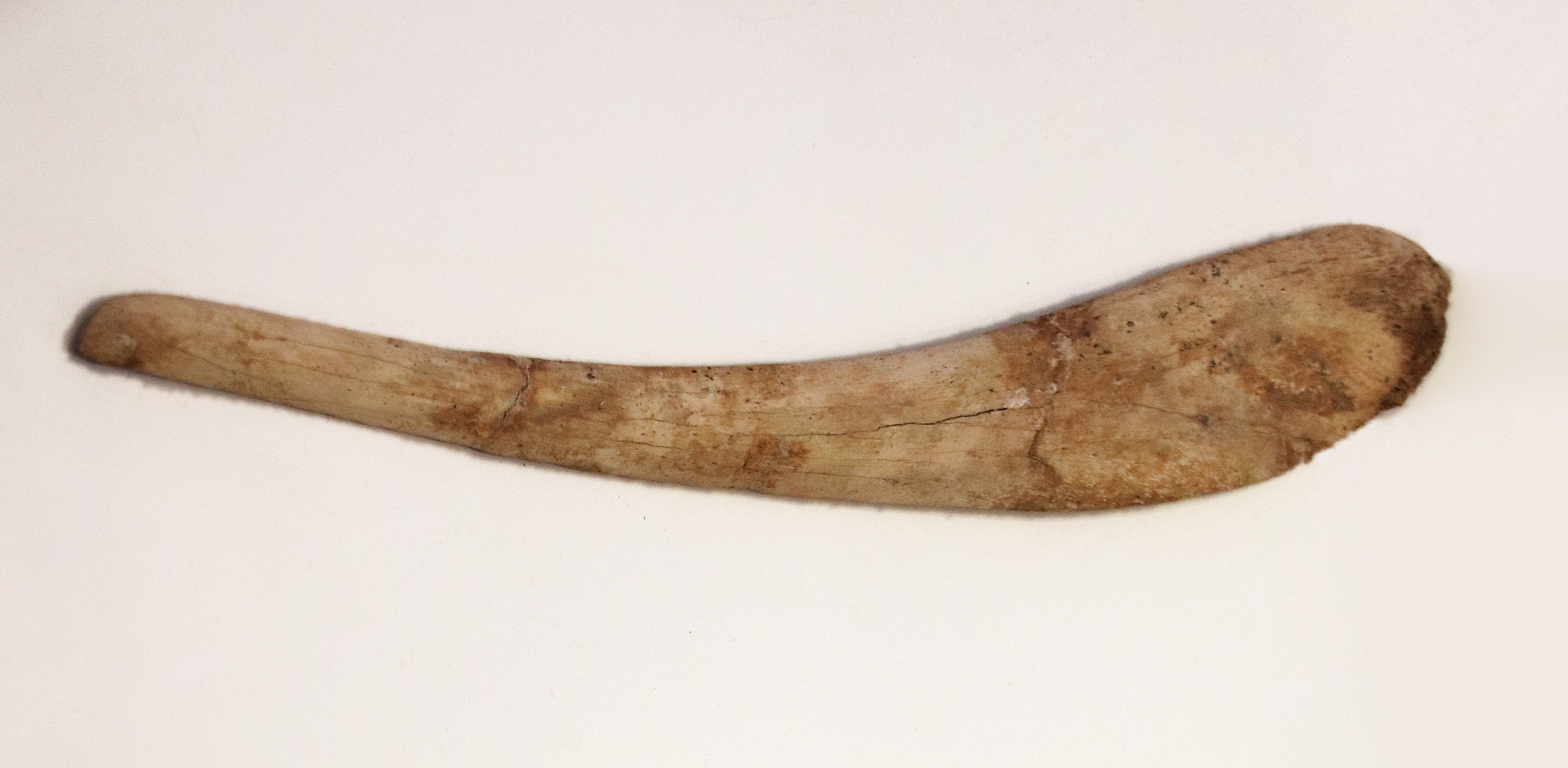
Bovine-rib dagger, HaYonim Cave, Upper Galilee; Natufian Culture, 12500-9500 BC.

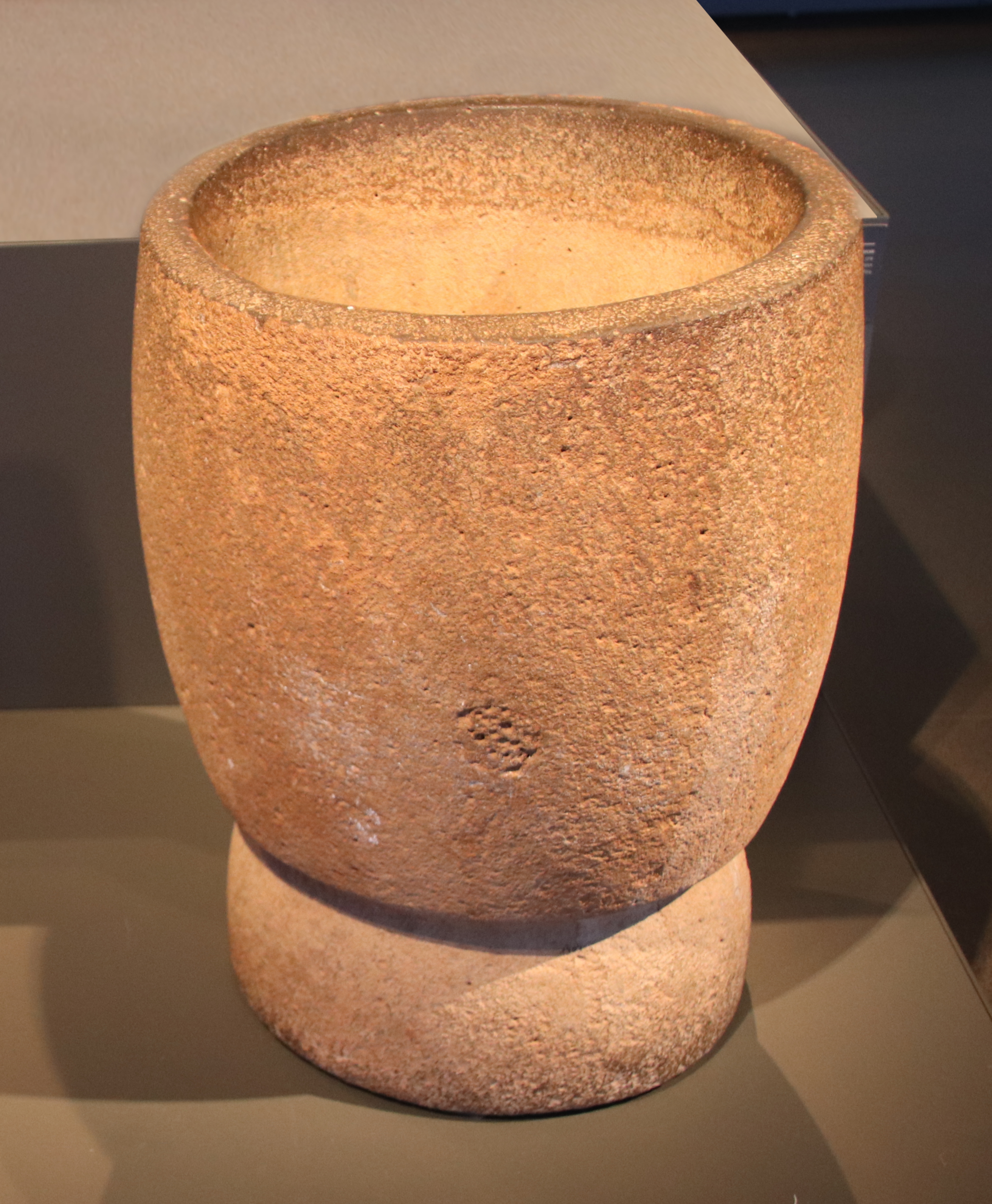
Stone mortars from ʿAin Mallaha; Natufian period, 12500-9500 BC

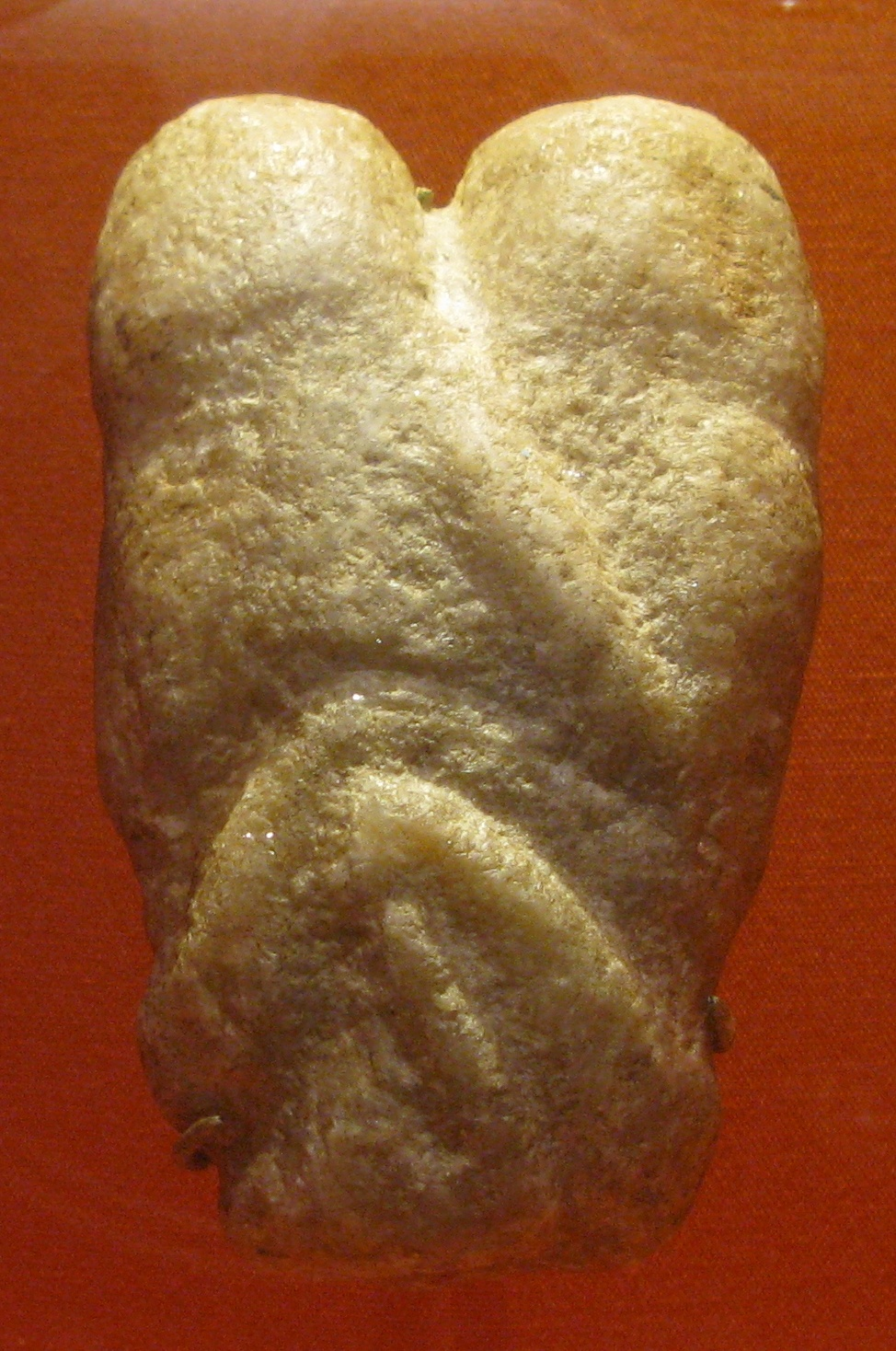
The Ain Sakhri figurine, Ain Sakhri caves, West Bank, near Bethlehem, Palestine. British Museum: 1958,1007.1

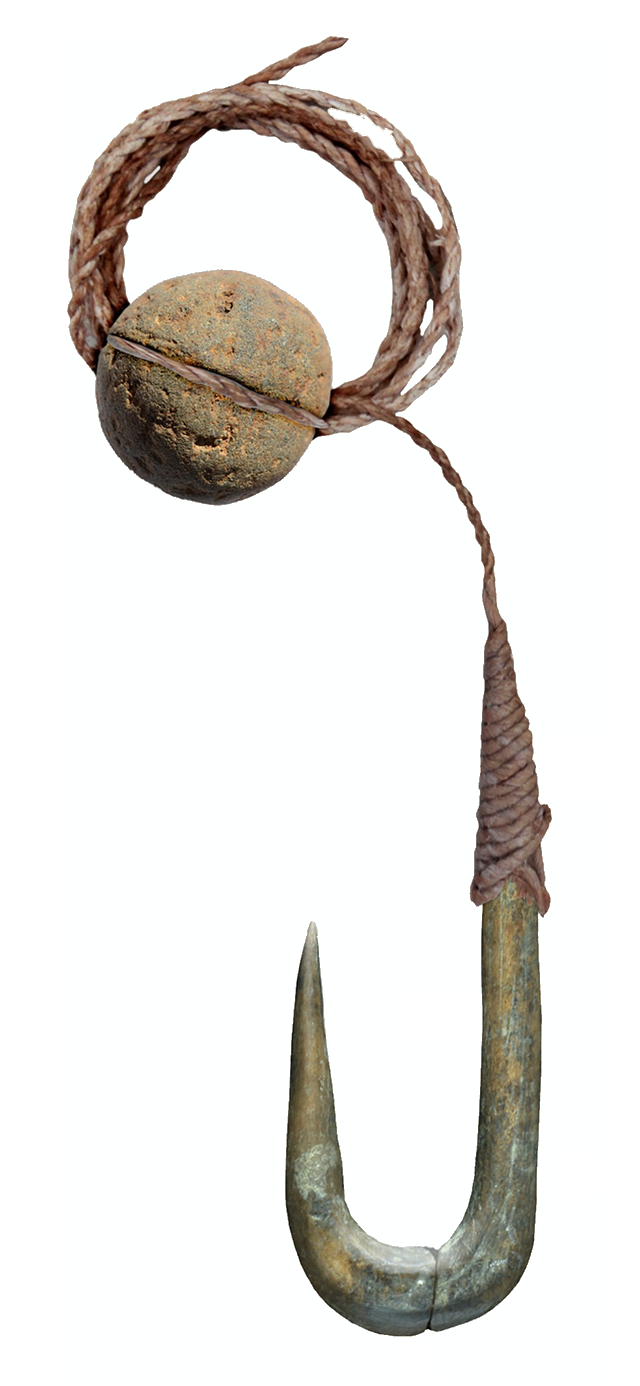
Stone fishing hook and sinker (a grooved pebble), used on Lake Hula in the Northern District of Israel during the Late Epipalaeolithic

== Other regions ==
=== Arabia ===
Until recently, it was thought that the Arabian Peninsula was too arid and inhospitable for human settlement in the Late Pleistocene. The earliest known sites belonged to the early Neolithic, c. 9000 to 8000 BP, and it was supposed that people were able to recolonise the region then due to the wetter climate of the early Holocene.

However, in 2014, archaeologists working in the southern Nefud desert discovered an Epipalaeolithic site dating to between 12,000 and 10,000 BP. The site is located in the Jubbah basin, a palaeolake which retained water in the otherwise dry conditions of the Terminal Pleistocene. The stone tools found bore a close resemblance to the Geometric Kebaran, a Levantine industry associated with the Middle Epipalaeolithic. The excavators of the site, therefore, proposed that northern Arabia was colonised by foragers from the Levant around 15,000 years ago. These groups may then have been cut off by the drying climate and retreated to refugia like the Jubbah palaeolake.

== Food sources ==
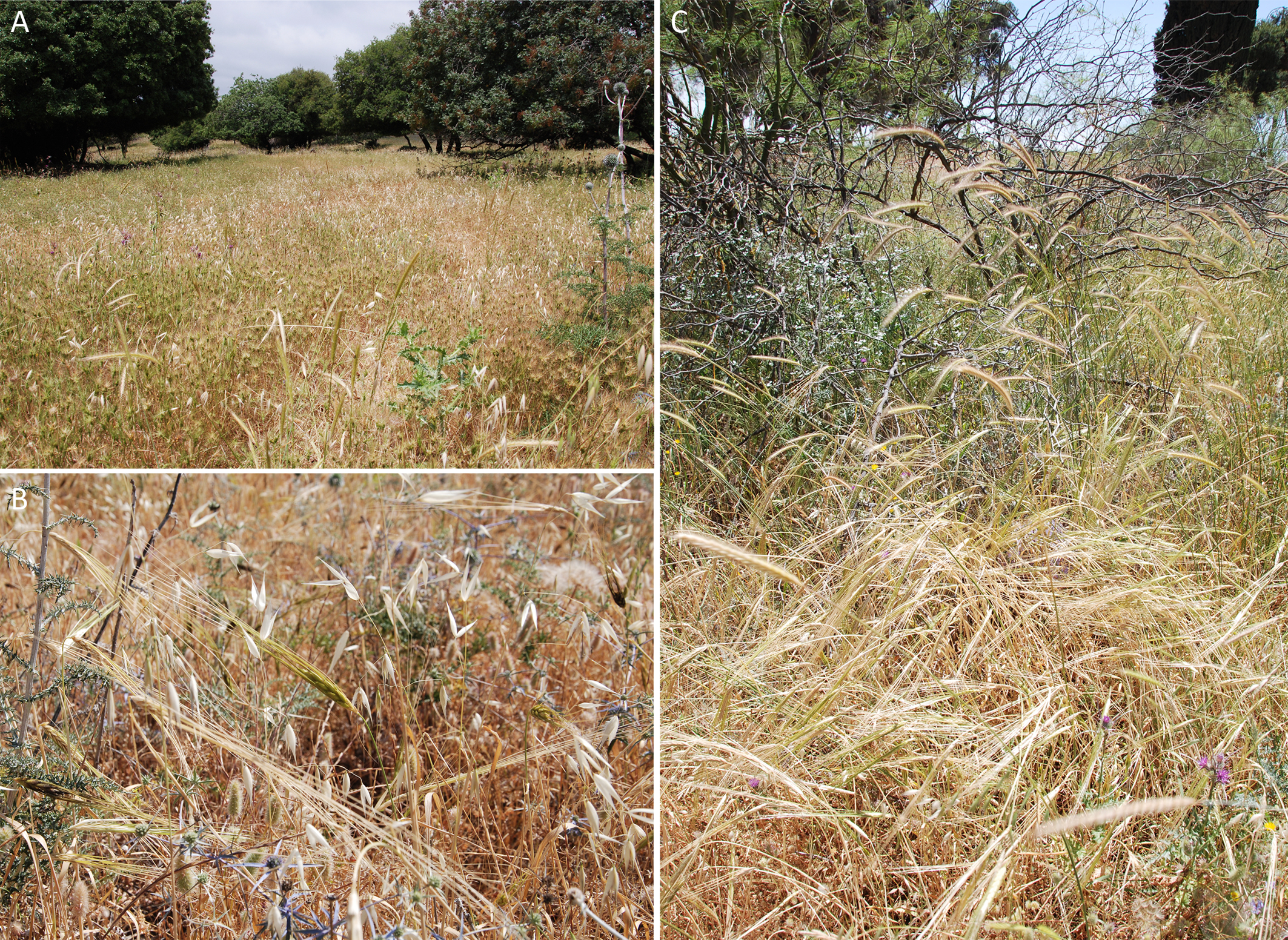
Associations of wild cereals and other wild grasses in northern Israel

The Epipalaeolithic is best understood when discussing the southern Levant, as the period is well documented due to good preservation at the sites, at least of animal remains. The most prevalent animal food sources in the Levant during this period were: deer, gazelle, and ibex of various species, and smaller animals including birds, lizards, foxes, tortoises, and hares. Less common were aurochs, wild equids, wild boar, wild cattle, and hartebeest. At Neve David near Haifa, 15 mammal species were found, and two reptile species. Despite then being very close to the coast, the rather small number of seashells found (7 genera) and the piercing of many, suggests these may have been collected as ornaments rather than food.

However, the period seems to be marked by an increase in plant foods and a decrease in meat-eating. Over 40 plant species have been found by analysing one site in the Jordan Valley, and some grains were processed and baked. Stones with evidence of grinding have been found. These were most likely the main food sources throughout the Pre-Pottery Neolithic A, which introduced the widespread agricultural growing of crops.

== See also ==
- Trialetian Mesolithic
- Levantine archaeology
- Levantine Aurignacian
- List of archaeological periods (Levant)
- Mesolithic Europe
