= Hallan Çemi =

Archaeological site in south-eastern Anatolia, Turkey

- Hallan Çemi Tepesi; Hallan Çemi Höyüğü
- Neolithic settlements around 7500 BCE and their location in the Fertile Crescent; Hallan Çemi is in the north.
- Interactive map of Hallan Çemi
- 38°13′27″N 41°14′30″E
- Periods: Neolithic
- Cultures: Pre-Pottery Neolithic A
- Location: Batman Province, Turkey

History
- Built: c. 9700 BCE
- Abandoned: c. 9270 BCE

Site notes
- Archaeologists: Michael Rosenberg
- Owner: Private

Designations
- Designation: 960-1

Hallan Çemi is a Protoneolithic site in south-eastern Anatolia which was discovered in 1989 and is believed to be more than 11,000 years old (founded c. 9500 BC). Tools were made from flint and obsidian. There is evidence of malachite, a copper ore, being imported and suggesting the existence of a trading network. Staples included lentils, almonds and pistachios. Whereas sheep and goat were usually the first animals to be kept as livestock by Near East communities, it appears that Hallan Çemi began with pigs.

== Excavations ==
It was discovered in 1990 during the surveys carried out by Michael Rosenberg and H. Togul in the water collection area while the Batman Dam was under construction. A chipped stone industry and decorated stone vessels were found during the investigations in the region. Thereupon, excavations were carried out by the USA University of Delaware, METU TEKDAM (Historical Artifacts Recovery and Evaluation Research Center) and Diyarbakır Museum under the direction of Rosenberg in 1990–94.

The primary aim of the excavations was to obtain sufficient information about the livelihood economies of the residents.

== Architecture ==
Excavations results of the Pre-Pottery Neolithic A dated at least four stages in the placement structure is identified. However, excavations were made enough to reveal architectural remains in the top three building phases.

It is thought that there is a natural pit, one meter in diameter, that hut-style houses were built around. The pit was likely used as a garbage dump as evidenced by animal bones and stone fragments were found inside of it. It is understood that this pit, which is used in all three building levels, has a hut-style structure. In addition, the presence of three sheep skulls with their horns suggested that this pit was "multi-functional".

The architecture of all three building levels is different. Sandstone blocks were used in the first building level. The two circular structures unearthed during the excavations are 5–6 meters in diameter and their tops are knitted with branches. The entrance part of the buildings was left open and a second wall was built here in the form of a semicircle. A door opening is left on this wall. Between these two walls, the widest one is 1 meter at the front. The buildings were built by excavating the soil and half buried. The walls are up to one meter of stone and it is understood that the top was built using the knitting technique. In stone masonry walls, there are vertical grooves 10 centimeters in width. It is thought that the buttresses and reed-reed bundles forming the roof were plastered with mud.

In the middle of both buildings, three tap blocks and a U-shaped hearth were built. It is understood that the two buildings in question are not for residential purposes, but for general use by the community.

In the second building level, stones collected from the nearby Sason Stream were used. However, two round structures can be seen here as well, but they are smaller and there is no second wall in front. The floors, on the other hand, were formed by carefully placed sandstone blocks. River stones were used in the third building level. In this building level, there are U-shaped structures, whose floors are not stone-paved and whose function is unknown, seen in the other two building levels.

Although there are very few pottery found on the southern skirts of the hill, it is not possible to talk about the Pottery Neolithic settlement in the light of the findings.

== Archaeological finds ==
About 60% of the chipped stone tools and wastes found in the settlement are obsidian, the closest obsidian source is Nemrut Mountain at a distance of three days (100 km). In addition, goat and pig-headed pestles carved from stone were found. Stone beads are the finds from the ornaments of the people living in the settlement. Stone vessels carved from limestone are abundant even on the surface. It is stated that the Çayönü settlement bears similarities with such finds from the late layers. They are thin-walled, flat bottomed, almost vertical profiled bowls or deep bowls. The outer cedars are mostly carved with geometric decorations in the form of zigzag, cross lines and wavy lines. Descriptions of nature are also seen. In one of these, there is a very schematic depiction of three dogs or wolves walking in a row.

Animal bones collected during the excavations amount to 2 tons, mostly belonging to mammals. 36% of these belong to sheep, 7% to goats, for a total of 43%; 27% red deer, 13% dog and two types of fox and jackal, 12% pig, 3% grizzly bear, and 2% of them are hare bones, with lower percentages of marten, wild cat, beaver, and porcupine. Of these bones, initial signs of domestication are present only in pig bones, with some teeth between domestic pig and wild boar values while others are within the range of domestic pig teeth. This evidence suggests that the domestication of the pig is early in the process. Although there is no evidence of attempts to domesticate sheep, goats, and cattle the hunting strategy followed for these animals is notable in that male animals were preferred. It is thought that this bias was to preserve the species population. Non-mammal food sources included two types of fish, lizards, turtles and various birds, although turtles are by far the majority. One of the most important pieces of information provided thus far by the Hallan Çemi excavations is that the pig was the first animal domesticated, at least in Eastern Anatolia.

The heads of excavation, Michel Rosenberg and Dr. Richard Redding, published a series of articles and suggested that Hallan Çemi residents used a kind of pig farming known as the "New Guinea Model" after its practicing today in New Guinea. According to this model, sows were handled and allowed to mate with wild boars. Of the resulting offspring, the males were killed and eaten at a certain age along with some females, while other females were fed to be bred later.

More than 130 freshwater oyster shells have been collected in excavations. The growth lines of 63 of the shells have reached the present day as strong enough to be examined. 16% of these finds were removed from the water during the slow growing season, summer; 43% were collected before the high-growth period, early or mid-autumn; 19% during the full rapid-growth period in late autumn and winter; and 16% at the end of the fast-growing period in spring. This ranging across seasons is evidence that the Hallan Çemi settlement is not a seasonal settlement but a permanent one.

== Evaluation ==
It is a small settlement with no building density. It is approximately 1.5 acres in area.

Although they lead a settled life, Hallan Çemi's livelihood is hunter-gatherer . The diets of these resident hunter-gatherers are predominantly based on nuts, legumes and a variety of game animals. Especially the consumption of nuts was highlighted. Therefore, it is seen as a community that has not yet started agriculture. Except for the pig, he is also on the verge of domestication, there is no evidence that the animal was domesticated.

The plant remains uncovered give an idea about the plants collected. There is no evidence of wild or cultivated cereals. In the chipped stone industry of the settlement, no finds are found in the style used to make sickle knives. Commonly collected wild plants are lentils, peas, vetch, almonds. Wild almonds have been widely consumed, although they contain toxins. He probably had some way of removing the toxin. The findings of charred wild almonds suggest that this detoxification process may be roasting the almond.

However, dating with new findings in 1993 is made to roughly 11,700 - 11,270 years before the present day of the settlement. It can be safely said that the settlement dates back to at least the 10th - 9th millennium BC. According to this, Hallan Çemi is thought to be the oldest-known settlement in Anatolia. On the other hand, the information obtained from the excavations necessitates accepting that this settlement was least affected by the Levant settlements of the period. What is meant here is the Natufian Culture of the Levant. Although the influences of the Natufian Culture are weak, it is suggested that the roots of the Hallan Çemi cultural tradition are rooted in the Zarzian Culture, an Upper Paleolithic - Epipalaeolithic culture. The excavation head also describes the rubble tools of the settlement as similar to the Zarzian Epipalaeolithic tools.

There are various approaches to the dating of the settlement and discussions based on these. The head of the excavation considers Epipalaeolithic ends and Pottery Neolithic heads, although they are adjacent to each other.
