= Hotu and Kamarband Caves =

Cave and archaeological site in Iran

Hotu and Kamarband Caves غار هوتو/غارکمربند
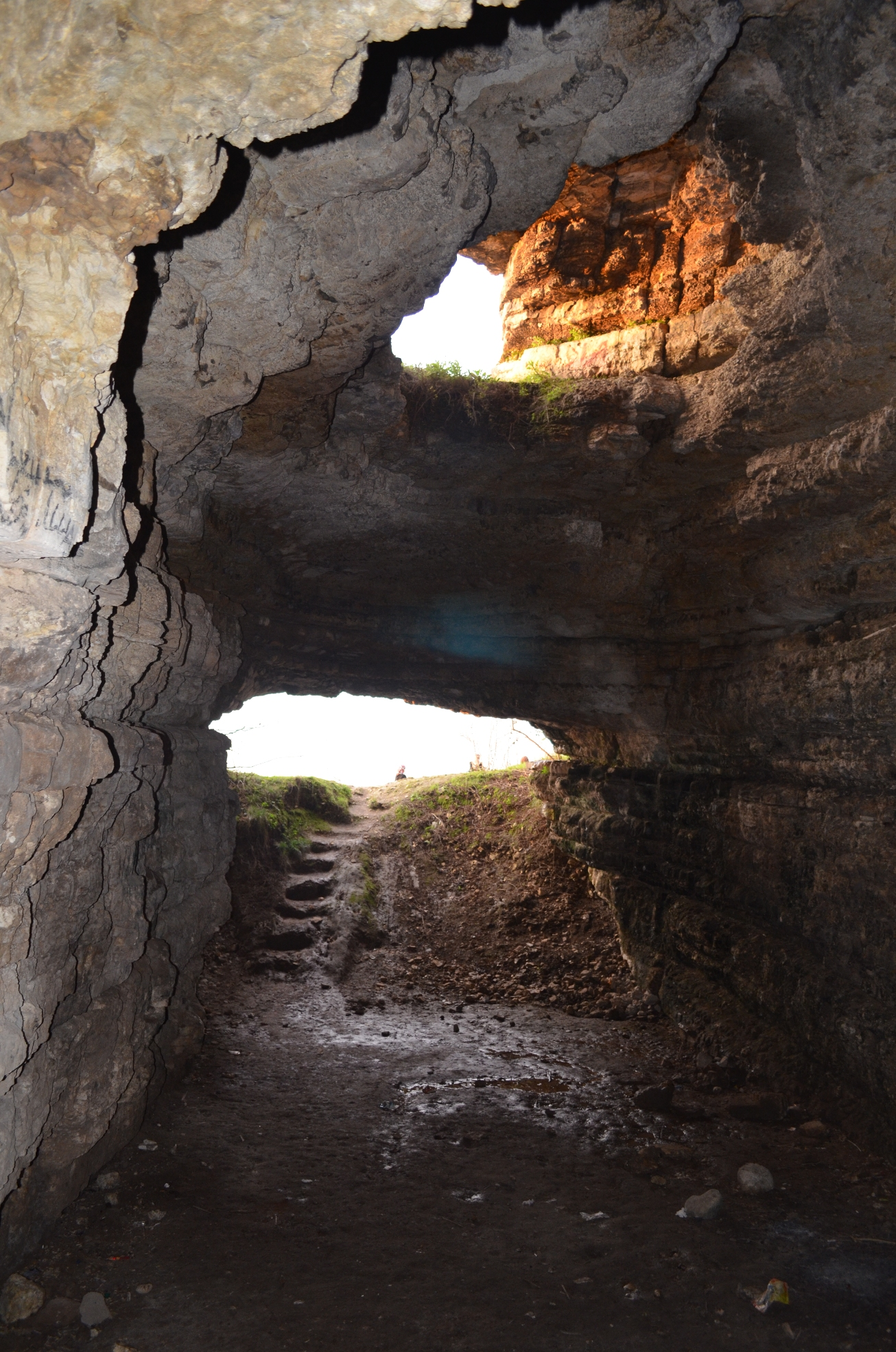
- Lower and upper entries of Hotu Cave from inside the cave.
- Interactive map of Hotu and Kamarband Caves غار هوتو/غارکمربند
- Cultures: Eight different cultures attributed from 9,910 BC to 6,120 BC
- Location: Toroujen (Shahid Abad), Alborz, Mazandaran province, Iran

Site notes
- Excavation dates: 1949–1957, led by Carleton S. Coon
- Website

Iran National Heritage List
- Official name: Hotu and Kamarband Caves
- Type: Archaeological Site
- Designated: 1967
- Reference no.: 746
- Conservation organization: Cultural Heritage, Handicrafts and Tourism Organization of Iran

The Hotu and Kamarband Caves or Belt Caves are prehistoric archaeological sites in Iran. They are located 100 m (330 ft) apart, in a cliff on the slopes of the Alborz mountains in the village of Toroujen (currently called Shahid Abad), 5 km (3.1 mi) south-west of Behshahr in the Mazandaran province. Hotu Cave has an approximate size of 30 m × 20 m (98.4 ft × 65.6 ft).

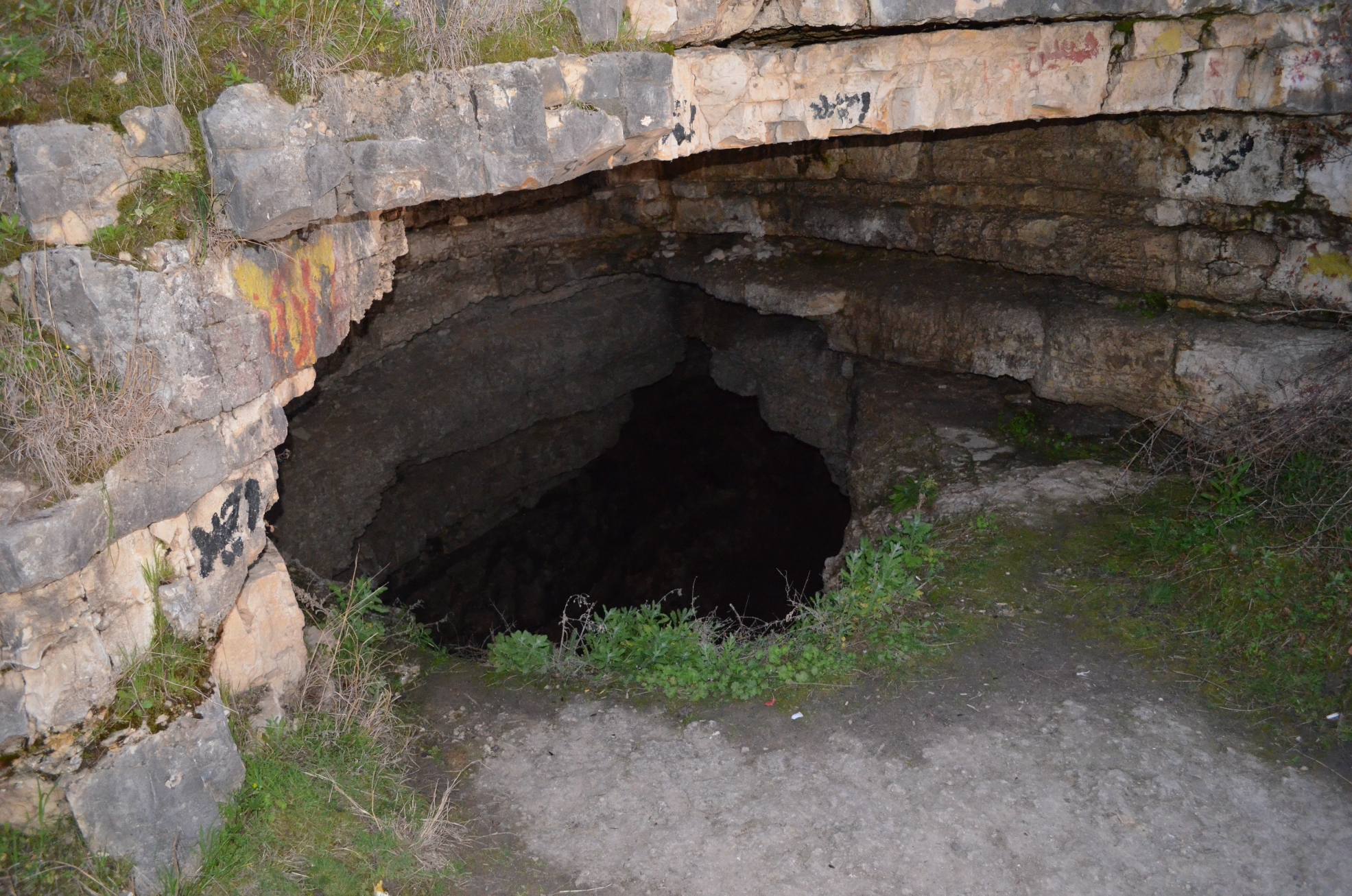
Upper entry of Hotu cave

== Excavations and findings ==
Excavations took place led by Carleton S. Coon and were reported on between 1949 and 1957. The site produced pottery shards, stone tools and material that could be radio-carbon dated. Twenty-two samples were dated and attributed to eight different cultures. The oldest pottery was dated to 6090-5210 cal BC. The two earliest cultures, present at around 9,910 to 7,240 years BCE are assumed to be seal hunters and vole eaters. The bones of a dog have been cited as an example of exceptionally early animal domestication. Pre-Neolithic finds date to around 6,120 years BCE.

Kamarband cave is notable for three human skeletons discovered there, dating to approximately 9,000 years BCE. Other finds include flint blades, walrus and deer bones, giving valuable information about human development from the ice age in the Mazandaran area.

== DNA analysis of cave dwellers ==
At Hotu Cave dwellers were identified as having Y-chromosome haplogroup J (xJ2a1b3, J2b2a1a1), with a more refined analysis putting it at J2a-PF5008*. These remains are from 9100-8600 BCE.

== Literature ==
- C. S. Coon, Cave Explorations in Iran 1949, Museum Monographs, The University Museum, University of Pennsylvania, Philadelphia, 1951.
- C. S. Coon, "Excavations in Huto Cave, Iran, 1951: A Preliminary Report", Proceedings of the American Philosophical Society; 96, 1952, pp. 231–69.
- C. S. Coon, The Seven Caves: Archaeological Explorations in the Middle East, New York, 1957.
