= Uruk period =

Archaeological culture of Mesopotamia

- Geographical range: Mesopotamia
- Period: Copper Age
- Dates: c. 4000–3100 BC
- Type site: Uruk
- Preceded by: Ubaid period
- Followed by: Jemdet Nasr period

The Uruk period (c. 4000/3900 to 3300/3100 BC; also known as Protoliterate period) is a period of the protohistoric Chalcolithic to Early Bronze Age in Mesopotamia and the ancient Near East. It follows the Ubaid period and precedes the Jemdet Nasr period (although that is often considered a final stage of the Late Uruk period). In the broadest sense, this period coincides with the 4th millennium BC. Uruk culture is also used to refer to the culture originating in Lower Mesopotamia during this period.

Named after the city of Uruk in southern Mesopotamia, this period saw a set of major innovations that lay the foundations of ancient Mesopotamian civilization. It is the period of the appearance of cities and the State (the so-called "urban revolution"), a phenomenon particularly visible in Lower Mesopotamia, notably on the site of Uruk, where excavations of the monumental center for the levels of the second half of the 4th millennium BC have revealed the existence of this culture. This phenomenon is marked by a greater specialization of activities and functions, which are accompanied by technical innovations: development of irrigated agriculture, appearance of the potter's wheel and of ceramics and bricks of standardized formats produced in large quantities, establishment of sheep farming producing wool, also on a large scale, in textile workshops, etc. The development of state institutions is accompanied by that of management instruments allowing the supervision of workers and other resources, and it is in this context that the first form of writing, 'Proto-cuneiform', appears around 3400-3300, essentially for administrative purposes.

These innovations were once thought to have originated in Uruk and southern Mesopotamia, but it has become increasingly evident that neighboring regions participated in the process and were not mere imitators. Other "proto-urban" sites and complex political entities also appeared in Susiana, southwestern Iran, northern Mesopotamia and western Syria, as well as in southeastern Anatolia. Nevertheless, Lower Mesopotamia is the most dynamic region of all, the most urbanized, the most innovative, and the most influential. It is the starting point of an 'Urukean expansion', a much-discussed long-term process seeing the implantation of outposts and colonies from southern Mesopotamia and a significant cultural impact of this region on the others. After a 'Late Uruk' phase (ca. 3500-3300/3200 BC) marking the apex of this phenomenon, after 3300/3200 BC this dynamic ceased and the Near East became culturally more fragmented.

== Chronology ==
=== Periodization ===
The term "Uruk period" was coined at a conference in Baghdad in 1930, along with the preceding Ubaid period and the following Jemdet Nasr period, based on data previously collected during the excavation of a few sites (Ur, Ubayd, Kish, Girsu, Jemdet-Nasr, and also Susa in southwestern Iran), supplemented by the first discoveries made by German archaeologists in Uruk in 1929. In the following years, a thorough study conducted in Uruk, followed by the excavation of the Uruk period levels, with their objects and tablets, completed in the 1950s and 1960s, provided the basis for the definition of Uruk material culture.

The traditional chronology is very imprecise and is based on some key sondages in the Eanna quarter at Uruk. The most ancient levels of these sondages (XIX–XIII) belong to the end of the Ubaid period (Ubaid V, 4200–3900 or even 3700 BC); pottery characteristic of the Uruk period begins to appear in levels XIV/XIII. The Uruk period is traditionally divided into three main periods, subdivided in sub-phases. The first is the "Early Uruk" (levels XII to IX of the Eanna test) and then "Middle Uruk" (levels VIII to VI). From the middle of the 4th millennium BC, we gradually move towards the best-known phase, that of the "Late Uruk" (levels V and IV A and B), which lasted until around 3100 BC, or, according to more recent proposals based on carbon 14 dating, around 3300 BC. The Cuneiform Digital Library Initiative dates the tablets of the last phase, Uruk IV, ca. from 3350 to 3200 Then comes a transitional phase, Uruk III or Jemdet Nasr, sometimes considered a final Late Uruk period. It ends ca. 3000 BC.

With the exploration of other parts of the Near East in the last decades of the 20th century, especially northern Mesopotamia and Syria, there was a need for a new periodization. In 2001, a new chronology was proposed by the members of a colloquium at Santa Fe, based on recent excavations, especially at sites outside Mesopotamia. They consider the Uruk period to be the "Late Chalcolithic" (LC). Their LC 1 corresponds to the end of the Ubaid period and ends around 4200 BC, with the beginning of LC 2, which is the first phase of the Uruk period. They divide "Early Uruk" into two phases, with the dividing line placed around 4000 BC. Around 3800 BC, LC 3 begins, which corresponds to the "Middle Uruk" phase and continues until around 3400 BC, when it is succeeded by LC 4. It rapidly transitions to LC 5 (Late Uruk and Jemdet Nasr), which continues until 3000 BC.

Some other chronological proposals have also been put forward, such as by the ARCANE team (Associated Regional Chronologies for the Ancient Near East).

=== Outline of the 4th millennium BC in the Near East ===
In the broad sense, the Uruk period covers the entire 4th millennium BC.

The early phases of the Late Chalcolithic (LC 1), in the second half of the 5th millennium BC, are equivalent to the latest phases of the Ubaid period (Uruk strata XVI to XIV). Around 4000 BC, or even earlier (around 4200?), the following stages LC 2 and 3 roughly match the Early Uruk period (levels XIII to IX), initially characterized by a substantial change in the ceramic assemblage (development of wheel-made vases and beveled rim bowls typical of the Uruk period). Those periods are very poorly documented in Lower Mesopotamia. The study of settlement through land surveys indicated a complexification of its structure, which became multimodal and very differentiated, in contrast to the more simple, bi-modal, Ubayd organization. Larger, urban-size, sites appear (40 hectares and more: Eridu, Uruk, Tell al-Hayyad), as well as other smaller settlements down to the village/hamlet level. A cultural homogenization occurred, contributing to the formation of the Early Uruk culture, which also affected Susiana: stone vessels, architectural decorations, the presence of accounting tokens. The first colonial settlements can also be seen in neighboring regions (Kunji, Godin Tepe, Logardan, Girdi Qala). Further north, a homogenization of the ceramic repertoire is observed, making it possible to delineate several geographically larger horizons than previously, notably the group comprising northern Mesopotamia, Syria, eastern Anatolia, and the southern Caucasus. Important settlements appear in Upper Mesopotamia and Syria: Tell Brak, Hamoukar, Nineveh, Tepe Gawra

While northern and southern Mesopotamia followed the same trend during the first half of the 4th millennium BC, a significant change occurred after 3700/3600 BC at the beginning of the Middle Uruk period. The South began to surpass its neighbors in terms of scale, population density, and social complexity, increasing its influence in the Near East, a phenomenon that culminated in the later stages of the Uruk period.

In Lower Mesopotamia, the Middle Uruk period (Uruk strata VIII/VII to VI), which corresponds roughly to the LC 4 period, is marked by important changes in the ceramic assemblage, notably a diversification of forms. Uruk greatly exceeds in size the other urban settlements of the region, acquires large-scale monumental architecture (e.g. the "Stone Building"), and the first symbolic cylinder seals and bullae appear there, testifying to the development of the administration. The expansion of Uruk culture increased between 3800 and 3500 BC, with the development of enclaves and the first colonies.

The Late Uruk period (LC 5) is defined by levels VI to IV. Its ceramic assemblage is poorly known; it is therefore better characterized by its glyptics, monumental architecture, and administrative tablets. Most of the data on the Uruk period date from this late period, including the extensively studied epigraphic documentation, which explains why studies are mainly focused on its final phase. Uruk reached an impressive area of 250 hectares during the Uruk IV phase, and was at the center of a polity of about 80,000 to 90,000 inhabitants, the result of an 'explosive' growth, while other cities in the region appeared to be in decline (notably Eridu). The large-scale building program, which produced monumental buildings of unprecedented size, also reveals the central importance of Uruk at this phase. The development of bookkeeping devices culminates in the invention of Proto-cuneiform writing at the end of the period, ca. 3350-3200 BC (Uruk IV epigraphic phase). Urukean expansion reached its peak during this period, ca. 3500-3200 BC, with the creation of new colonies such as Habuba Kabira and the increased acculturation of local sites. Urukean influence is less and less marked the further one moves away from southern Mesopotamia, although it remained perceptible over a vast area.

The Uruk IV level at Uruk ends around 3300 BC according to recent data, ending Uruk period strictly speaking. The subsequent phase, Uruk III, is also referred as the Jemder Nasr period in southern Mesopotamia. This period, around 3200–3100 BCE, also coincides with an abrupt, severe climate shift known as the Piora oscillation, which caused widespread drought and cooling in many places around the globe. This rapid environmental change brought an end to a long, wetter and warmer era known as the Holocene climatic optimum, and precipitated the decline and restructuring of Mesopotamian civilization. The earlier Holocene conditions allowed agricultural systems and early city populations to flourish much better.

Jemder Nasr period constitutes a 'transitional' phase (or an 'interlude'), often seen as a final stage of the Late Uruk and therefore included in the studies of the period. The beginning of this phase sees important changes: the monumental buildings of Uruk are leveled and replaced by new ones, maybe reflecting a political crisis, the beveled rim bowls are replaced by coarse conical bowl, painted ceramic reappear. The settlement pattern of the region shifts towards new configurations. But many urukean cultural traits are preserved, and most of the Proto-cuneiform tablets date from this period (Uruk III epigraphic stage, ca. 3200-3000 BC). The transition to the 3rd millennium opens a new era, the Early Dynastic Period. Beyond southern Mesopotamia, the colonial sites have been deserted (probably before the changes at Uruk) and Urukean influence declined in the Near East, replaced by several regional traditions ('Proto-Elamite' in southwestern Iran, 'Post-Uruk' and 'Nineveh 5' in northern Mesopotamia).

== Lower Mesopotamia ==
=== Environment and settlement ===
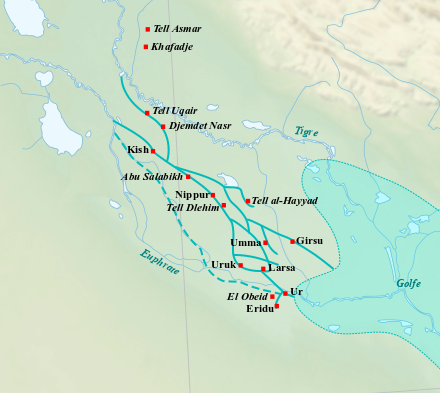
Location of the main sites in southern Mesopotamia in the Uruk and Jamdet Nasr periods.

This is the region of the Near East that was the most agriculturally productive, as a result of an irrigation system which developed in the 4th millennium BC and focused on the cultivation of barley (along with the date palm and various other fruits and legumes) and the pasturing of sheep for their wool, combined with the exploitation of the resources of the marshes scattered in this region (fish, birds, reed). The climate was wetter during the first half of the 4th millennium BC and effective moisture peaked around 3500 BCE; by around 3200 BCE, the region became drier. With these new conditions, irrigation agriculture became increasingly important. These changes could explain some of the social and political developments during the second part of the Uruk period, such as the Uruk expansion. Although it lacked mineral resources and was located in an increasingly arid area, southern Mesopotamia had undeniable geographic and environmental advantages: it consisted of a vast delta, a flat region transected by waterways, resulting in a potentially vast area of cultivable land, over which communications by river or land were easy.

It may also have become a highly populated and urbanized region in the 4th millennium BC, with a social hierarchy, craft specialization, and long-distance commerce. It has been the focus of archaeological investigations led by Robert McCormick Adams Jr., whose work has been vital to understanding the emergence of urban societies in this region. A clear settlement hierarchy has been identified, dominated by a number of agglomerations which grew more and more important over the 4th millennium BC, of which Uruk seems to have been the most important by far, making this the most ancient known case of urban macrocephaly, since its hinterland seems to have reinforced Uruk itself to the detriment of its neighbors (notably the region to the north, around Adab and Nippur) in the final part of the period.

The ethnic composition of this region in the Uruk period cannot be determined with certainty. It is connected to the problem of the origins of the Sumerians (the so-called "Sumerian problem" or "question") and the dating of their emergence (if they are considered locals of the region) or their arrival (if they are thought to have migrated) in lower Mesopotamia. There is no agreement on the archaeological evidence for a migration, or on whether the earliest form of writing already reflects a specific language. Some argue that it is actually Sumerian, in which case the Sumerians would have been its inventors and would have already been present in the region in the final centuries of the 4th millennium at the latest (which seems to be the most widely accepted position). Whether other ethnic groups were also present, especially Semitic ancestors of the Akkadians or one or several 'pre-Sumerian' peoples (neither Sumerian nor Semite and predating both in the region) is also debated and cannot be resolved by excavation.

=== Uruk ===
Out of these urban agglomerations, it is Uruk, the period's eponymous site, which was the largest by far, according to current knowledge, and it is the main one from which the chronological sequence of the period has been constructed. It may have covered 230–250 hectares during the Late Uruk period, more than any other contemporary large settlement, and may have had a population of between 25,000 and 50,000 people. The architectural profile of the site consists of two monumental groups located 500 meters apart.

The most remarkable constructions are located in the sector called Eanna (after the temple that was located there in subsequent periods, and possibly already at this stage). After the 'Limestone Temple' of level V, a construction program hitherto unparalleled was begun in level IV. Thereafter, the buildings were vastly larger than before; some had novel designs, and new construction techniques were used for both structure and decoration. Level IV of the Eanna is divided into two monumental groups: in the west, a complex centered on the 'Temple with mosaics' (decorated with mosaics made of painted clay cones) of level IVB, subsequently covered by another building (the 'Riemchen Building') of level IVA. To the east there is a very important group of structures—such as a 'Square Building' and the 'Riemchen Temple Building', which were subsequently replaced by other buildings with original plans, like the 'Hall with Pillars' and the 'Hall with Mosaics', a square 'Grand Court' and two very large buildings with a tripartite plan, 'Temple C' (54 x 22 m) and 'Temple D' (80 x 50 m, the largest building known from the Uruk period).

The second monumental sector was attributed to the god Anu by the site's excavators because it was the location of a sanctuary to this god some 3000 years later. It is dominated by a series of temples built on a high terrace after the Ubayd period. The best-preserved of these is the "White Temple" of level IV, which measures 17.5 x 22.3 m and gets its name from white plates that covered its walls. At its base, a building with a labyrinthine plan, called the 'Stone building', was built.

Eanna, levels VI–V.

Eanna, level IV.

Sector of An, levels IV–III.

The function of these buildings, which are unparalleled in their size and the fact that they are gathered in monumental groups, is debated. The excavators of the site wanted to see them as 'temples', influenced by the fact that in the historic period, the Eanna was the area dedicated to the goddess Inanna and the other sector was dedicated to the god An. This conformed to the theory of the 'temple-city' which was in vogue during the inter-war period. The present view is that it is probably a mix of administrative and religious structures: palatial residences, administrative spaces, cultic reception halls, and meeting places for political assemblies, etc. In any case, it was necessary to invest considerable effort and resources to construct these buildings, which shows the capacities of the elites of this period.

=== Other sites in Lower Mesopotamia ===
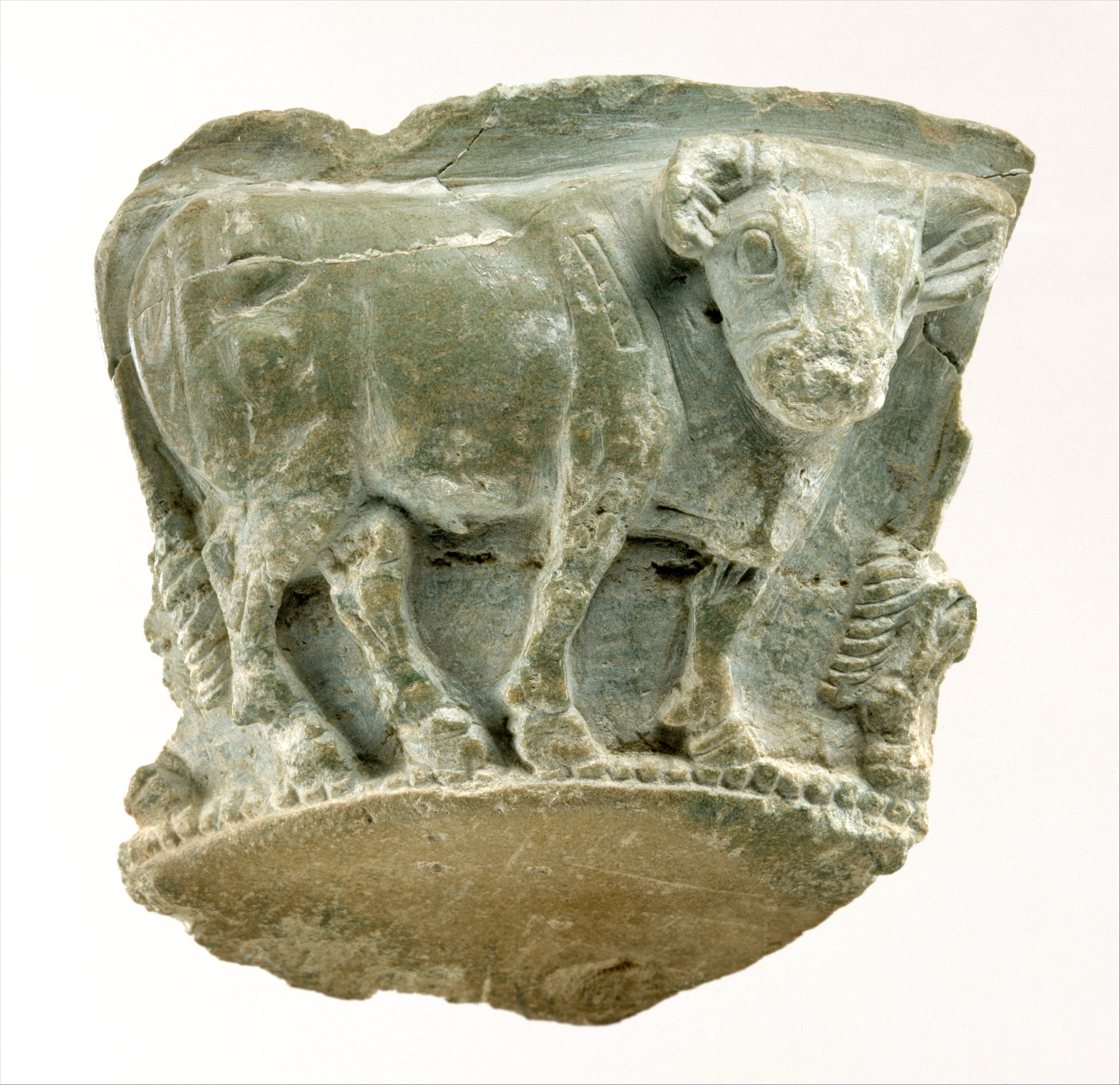
Fragment of a bowl with a frieze of bulls in relief, ca. 3300–2900 B.C. Late Uruk–Jemdet Nasr periods. Southern Mesopotamia

Outside Uruk, few sites in southern Mesopotamia have yielded levels contemporary with the Uruk period. Soundages carried out on the sites of most of the key cities of Mesopotamia in the historic period have revealed that they were occupied in this period (Kish, Girsu, Nippur, Ur, perhaps Shuruppak and Larsa, and further north in Diyala, Tell Asmar and Khafajah). The sacred quarter of Eridu, site of the main monumental structures of the Ubaid period in Lower Mesopotamia, is poorly known for the Uruk period, although Uruk-period pottery has been found there. The only important structure from the end of the 4th millennium BC so far known from the region outside Uruk is the 'Painted Temple' on the platform of Tell Uqair, which dates to the end of the Uruk period or perhaps the Jemdet Nasr period, and consists of two terraces superimposed on one another with a building of around 18 x 22 m identified as having a cultic function. A level belonging to the Uruk period has been revealed on the tell southeast of the site of Abu Salabikh ('Uruk Mound'), covering only 10 hectares. This site was surrounded by a wall which has been only partially revealed and several buildings have been brought to light, including a platform which supported a building, only traces of which remain. As for the site of Jemdet Nasr, which has given its name to the period of transition from the Uruk period to the Early Dynastic period, it is divided into two main tells and it is on the second (Mound B) that the most important building has been brought to light, which contained a substantial cache of administrative documents—more than 200 tablets with impressions of cylinder seals.

== Neighboring regions ==
The sources relating to the Uruk period derive from a group of sites distributed over an immense area, covering all of Mesopotamia and the neighboring regions up to central Iran and southeastern Anatolia. Scholars often speak of a 'Greater Mesopotamia' for this period, encompassing these regions, some of which are located beyond the traditional boundaries of Mesopotamia.

The Uruk culture itself is certainly characterized mainly by sites of southern Mesopotamia and others which seem to have directly resulted from migrations from this region (the 'colonies' or 'emporia'), which are clearly part of the Uruk culture. But the phenomenon which is known as the Uruk expansion is detected on sites situated across a vast zone of influence, covering the whole Near East, regions which were not all really part of the Uruk culture, which was strictly-speaking limited to Lower Mesopotamia. Uruk culture is more evident in the Upper Mesopotamia (Girdi Qala and Logardan, Grai Resh, Tell al-Hawa, and Kani Shaie for example), northern Syria, western Iran and southeastern Anatolia. They generally experienced an evolution similar to that of lower Mesopotamia, with the development of urban agglomerations and larger political entities and they were strongly influenced by the culture of the 'center' in the later part of the period (c. 3500–3200 BC), before a general strengthening of their own regional cultures took place at the turn of the 3rd millennium BC.

The interpretation of the expansion of the Uruk culture into neighboring regions poses numerous problems and many explanatory models (general and regional) have been proposed in order to explain it.

=== Susiana and the Iranian Plateau ===
The region around Susa in the southwest of modern Iran (Susiana, present-day Khuzistan), is located right next to lower Mesopotamia, which exercised a powerful influence on it from the 5th millennium BC, and might be considered to have been part of the Uruk culture in the second half of the 4th millennium BC, either as a result of colonization or a more gradual acculturation, but it did retain its own unique characteristics. Other sites in the region also have archaeological levels belonging to this period, such as Jaffarabad and Chogha Mish, which also bear witness to the stages of proto-urban and state formation. The Uruk period levels at Susa are called Susa I (c. 4000–3700 BC) and Susa II (c. 3700–3100 BC), during which the site became an urban settlement. Susa I saw the beginning of monumental architecture on the site, with the construction of a 'High Terrace', which was increased during Susa II to measure roughly 60 x 45 meters. The most interesting aspect of this site is the objects discovered there, which are the most important evidence available to us for the art of the Uruk period and the beginning of administration and writing. The cylinder seals of Susa I and Susa II have a very rich iconography, uniquely emphasising scenes of everyday life, although there is also some kind of local potentate which P. Amiet sees as a 'proto-royal figure,' preceding the 'priest-kings' of Late Uruk. These cylinder seals, as well as bullae, clay tokens and numerical tablets, indicate the rise of administration and of accounting techniques at Susa during the second half of the 4th millennium BC.

Further north, in the Zagros, the site of Godin Tepe in the Kangavar valley is particularly important. Level V of this site belongs to the Uruk period. Remains have been uncovered of an ovoid wall, enclosing several buildings organized around a central court, with a large structure to the north which might be a public building. The material culture has some traits which are shared with that of Late Uruk and Susa II. Level V of Godin Tepe could be interpreted as an establishment of merchants from Susa and/or lower Mesopotamia, interested in the location of the site on commercial routes, especially those linked to the tin and lapis lazuli mines on the Iranian Plateau and in Afghanistan. Further east, the key site of Tepe Sialk, near Kashan, shows no clear evidence of links with the Uruk culture in its Level III, but beveled rim bowls are found all the way out to Tepe Ghabristan in the Elbourz and near Jiroft at Mahtoutabad further to the southeast.

In this region, the retreat of the Uruk culture resulted in a particular phenomenon, the Proto-Elamite civilization, which seems to have been centered on the region of Tell-e Malyan and Susiana and seems to have taken over the Uruk culture's links with the Iranian plateau.

=== Upper Mesopotamia and northern Syria ===
==== Urukean colonies on the Euphrates ====
Several important sites of the Uruk period have been excavated in the Middle Euphrates region, during the salvage campaigns preceding the construction of hydroelectric dams in the area. It is largely as a result of the findings of these excavations that ideas of an "Uruk expansion" have arisen.

The best known site is Habuba Kabira South, a fortified port on the right bank of the river in Syria. The city covered around 22 hectares, surrounded by a defensive wall, roughly 10 percent of which has been uncovered. Study of the buildings on this site shows that it was a planned settlement, which would have required significant means. The archaeological material from the site is identical to that of Uruk, consisting of pottery, cylinder-seals, bullae, accounting calculi, and numerical tablets from the end of the period. Thus this new city has every appearance of being an Urukian colony. Around 20 residences of various sorts have been excavated. They have a tripartite plan, arranged around a reception hall with a foyer opening onto an internal courtyard, with additional rooms arranged around it. In the south of the site is a hill, Tell Qanas, which has a monumental group of several structures identified speculatively as 'temples' on an artificial terrace. The site was abandoned at the end of the 4th millennium BC, apparently without violence, during the period when the Uruk culture retreated.

Habuba Kabira is similar in many ways to the nearby site of Jebel Aruda on a rocky outcrop, only 8 km further north. As at Habuba Kabira, there is an urban center made up of residences of various kinds and a central monumental complex of two 'temples'. It is beyond doubt that this city too was built by 'Urukians'. A little further north, further Urukian outposts, Tell Qraya and Tell Sheikh Hassan, lay on the middle Euphrates. It is possible that these sites were part of a state implanted in the region by people from south Mesopotamia and were developed in order to take advantage of important commercial routes.

==== Tell Brak and Khabur valley ====
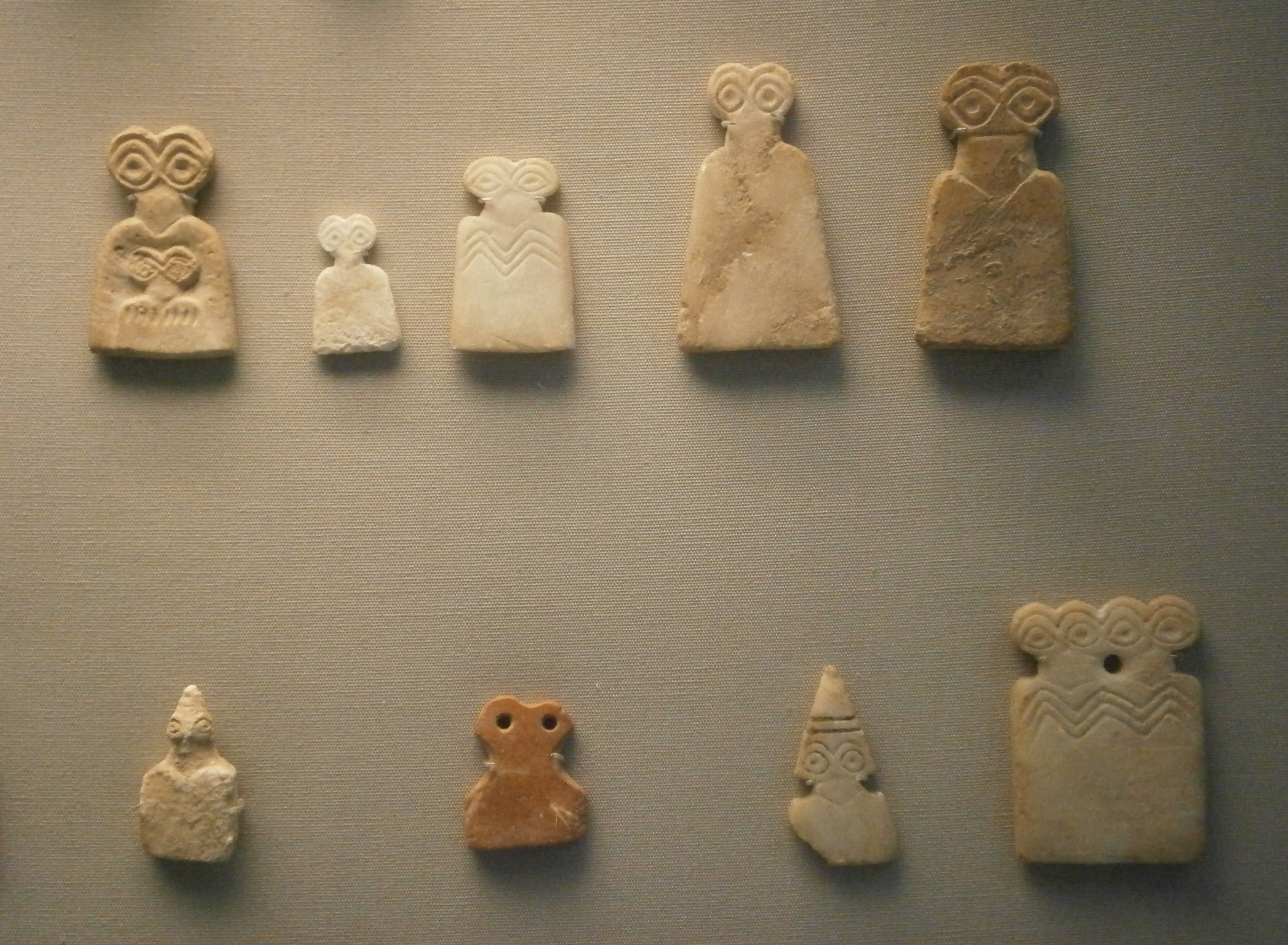
'Eye idols' from Tell Brak. British Museum.

In the Khabur valley, Tell Brak was an important urban center from the 5th millennium BC, one of the largest of the Uruk period, since it covered over 110 hectares at its height. Some residences from the period have been uncovered, along with pottery typical of Uruk, but what has received the most attention is a succession of monuments which are definitely for cultic purposes. The 'Eye Temple' (as its final stage is known) has walls decorated with terracotta cones which form a mosaic and with inlays of colored stones and a platform which might have been an altar and is decorated with gold leaf, lapis lazuli, silver nails, and white marble in a central T-shaped room. The most remarkable find are over two hundred "eye idols" which give the building its name. These figurines have enormous eyes and are definitely votive deposits. Tell Brak has also produced evidence of writing: a numeric tablet and two pictographic tablets showing some unique features in comparison to those of southern Mesopotamia, which indicates that there was a distinct local tradition of writing. This site could have been an Urukean colony, taken after a phase of destruction.

A little to the east of Tell Brak is Hamoukar, where excavations began in 1999. This vast site has provided the normal evidence found at sites under Urukian influence in Upper Mesopotamia (pottery, seals) and evidence of the existence of an important urban center in this region in the Uruk period, like Tell Brak. Excavators have also found traces of a violent destruction of the site ca. 3500 BC, with thousands of sling bullets, maybe caused by an army from Uruk.

Further to the east again, the site of Tell al-Hawa, Iraq also shows evidence of contacts with lower Mesopotamia.

==== Tell Kuyunjik and Tepe Gawra ====
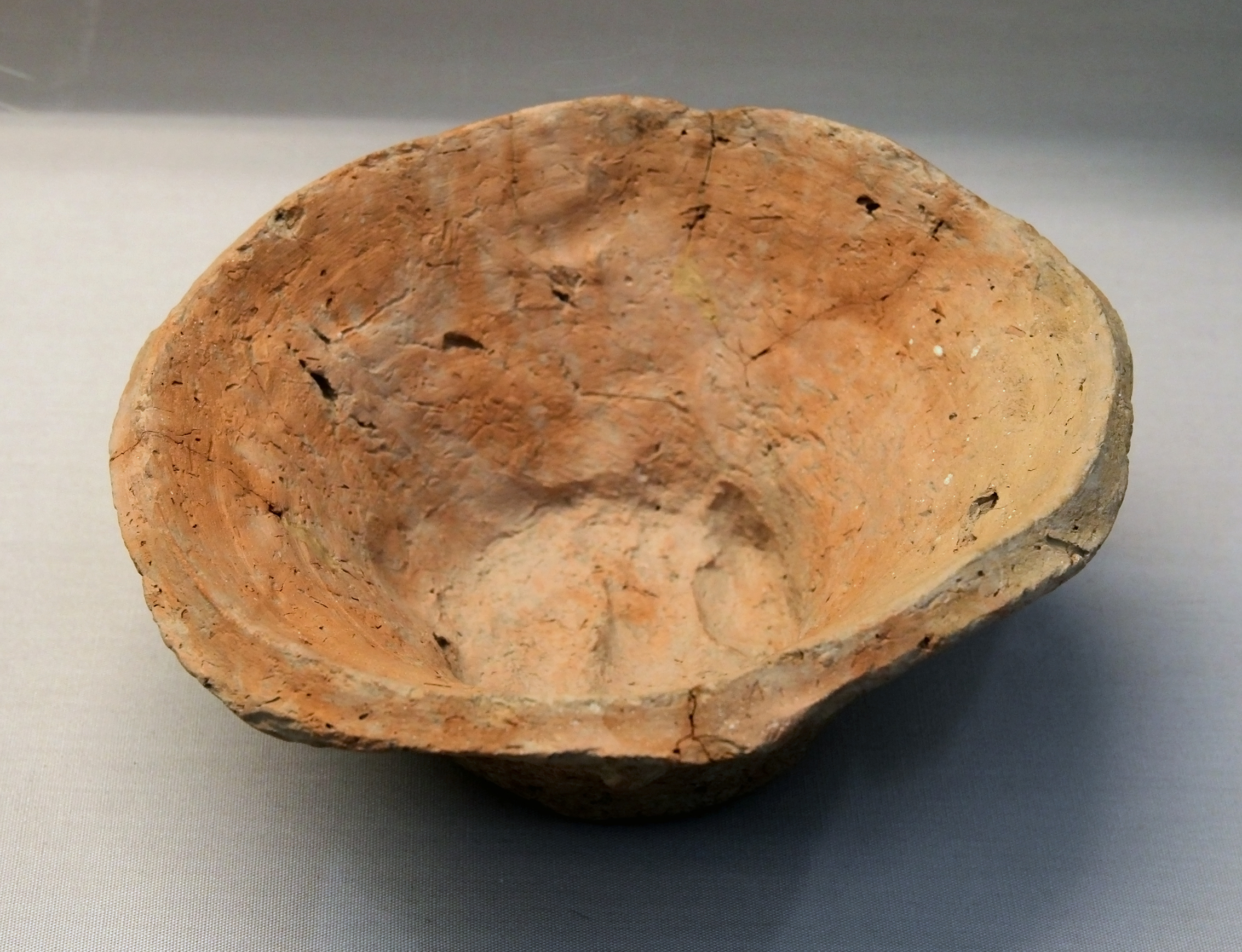
Beveled rim bowl from Kuyunjik/Nineveh. British Museum.

On the Tigris, the site of Nineveh (Tell Kuyunjik, level 4) was located on some major commercial routes and was also within the Urukian sphere of influence, maybe even a 'colony' in the Late Uruk period. The site covered roughly 40 hectares—the whole area of Tell Kuyunjik. The material remains of the period are very limited, but beveled rim bowls, an accounting bulla, and a numerical tablet characteristic of the Late Uruk period have been found.

Nearby, Tepe Gawra, which was also important in the Ubayd period, is an important case of the changing scale of monumental architecture and of political entities between the end of the 5th millennium and the 4th millennium BC (Level XII to VIII). The excavations there have revealed some very rich tombs, different kinds of residence, workshops, and very large buildings with an official or religious function (notably the 'round structure'), which may indicate that Tepe Gawra was a regional political center. Unlike its neighbor Kuyunjik, the influence of Urukean cultural traits in Gawra is limited.

=== Southeast Anatolia ===
Several sites have been excavated in the Euphrates valley in the south east of Anatolia, near the region of the Urukian sites of the middle Euphrates. Hacınebi Tepe, near modern Birecik in Şanlıurfa, was excavated by G. Stein and was located at the crossroads of some important commercial routes. Beveled rim bowls appear from phase B1 (c. 3800/3700 BC) and they are also present in phase B2 (3700–3300 BC), along with other objects characteristic of Late Uruk, like mosaics of clay cones, a terracotta sickle, an accounting bulla imprinted with the pattern from a cylinder seal, an uninscribed clay tablet, etc. This material co-exists with local pottery, which remains dominant throughout. The excavator of the site thinks that there was an enclave of people from Lower Mesopotamia (traders?) who lived on the site alongside a majority population of local people.

Other sites have been excavated in the region of Samsat (also in the Euphrates valley). An Urukian site was revealed at Samsat during a hasty rescue excavation before the area was flooded as a result of the construction of a hydroelectric dam. Fragments of clay cones from a wall mosaic were found. A little to the south is Kurban Höyük, where clay cones and pottery characteristic of Uruk have also been found in tripartite buildings.

Further to the north, the site of Arslantepe, located in the suburbs of Malatya, is the most remarkable site of the period in eastern Anatolia. It is a case of emergence of a complex administrative center without urbanization around it. During the first half of the 4th millennium BC, this site was dominated by a building called 'Temple C' by the excavators, which was built on a platform. It was abandoned around 3500 BC and replaced by a monumental complex which seems to have been the regional center of power. The culture of Late Uruk had a discernible influence, but the local culture remains fundamentally indigenous. Development of administration is seen most clearly in the numerous sealings found on the site. Around 3000 BC, the site was destroyed by a fire. The monuments were not restored and the Kura–Araxes culture centered on the southern Caucasus became the dominant material culture on the site. But in this region, the Urukian influence becomes increasingly ephemeral, as one gets further from Mesopotamia.

== Uruk expansion ==
The 'Uruk expansion': cultural profiles of sites (after P. Butterlin).

The Uruk period is characterized by a phenomenon of "Urukean Expansion," which is evident on the sites through the spread of the material and cultural traits typical of this culture, an Urukean "kit" including, in its final development, beveled-rim bowls, numerous forms of Urukean-type wheel-made ceramics, administrative and accounting tools (cylinder seals and bullae seals and numeral tablets), and tripartite constructions using Riemchem bricks. It is now established that the phenomenon was not brief but long-term. The first Urukean settlements can be seen at the beginning of the 4th millennium BC in the western Zagros, at Godin Tepe, Logardan, Qirdi Qala. In the middle of the millennium, real colonies such as Qraya, Gurga Ciya, Logardan, and Girdi Qala, Urukean enclaves on sites along important trade routes, Godin Tepe, Nineveh, Hacinebi, etc., can be seen. Most sites are located along trade routes, especially in river valleys. The beveled rim bowls characteristic of the Uruk repertoire are found from the Caucasus to Pakistan. The Late Uruk period saw the peak of the phenomenon, with the appearance of a network of settlements along the Euphrates (Habuba Kabira, Jebel Aruda) and, more generally, a rise in the number of sites exhibiting at least some elements of the Uruk "kit."

Since the identification of possible enclaves or settlements of Uruk culture, scholars have debated the nature of the phenomenon and its explanations. Guillermo Algaze took Immanuel Wallerstein's concept of the "world system" and notions from international trade theory to apply them to the Uruk period, thereby developing the first coherent model of the expansion of Uruk civilization. According to his proposals, the phenomenon is characterized as a complex set of "colonial intrusions": "Urukeans" would have established a network of outposts outside Lower Mesopotamia, mainly for economic reasons, to control trade routes along which raw materials transited. The sites concerned are proper "colonies", either with the creation of new sites on virgin soil or the takeover of older ones by coercive means, or diaspora-type outposts, maybe in some cases merchant implantations specialized in long-distance trade (at least initially). It is not necessarily a unitary and centralized phenomenon, because it could have been initiated by various (rival) cities.

Algaze's hypotheses initiated a very rich debate. Other explanations propose a form of agrarian colonization following a lack of land in Lower Mesopotamia, or a migration of refugees from the Uruk region following ecological or political problems. They are primarily put forward for sites in the Syro-Anatolian world, with few global theories advanced. War may have played an important role in the process. The evidence from Tell Hamoukar shows the existence of large-scale warfare, possibly involving an army from Uruk. Walled settlements became more common in northern Mesopotamia and Syria during the Late Uruk period. Other attempts at explanation leave aside the preponderance of political and economic considerations to focus on the Urukean expansion as a long-term cultural phenomenon, taking up for this the concepts of koine, acculturation, hybridization or cultural emulation while considering their differentiation according to cultural areas and sites. This approach involves taking into account the ways in which Uruk cultural elements were received (and therefore adopted, selected, adapted) by local populations, which can be done in different ways. P. Butterlin has proposed seeing the links uniting southern Mesopotamia and its neighbors at this time as a "world-culture" and not as an economic "world-system", in which the Uruk region provides a model for its neighbors, each of which takes up in its own way the most adaptable elements while retaining more or less strong specific traits: this explains the different degrees of influence or acculturation. Indeed, the Urukean impact is generally differentiated according to the sites and regions studied, which has led to the development of several typologies based on the material traces of the Urukean "kit". Some scholars have thus been able to distinguish several types of sites: "colonies", where the entire kit is found, which would be true 'Urukean' sites; sites with a "hybrid" profile where the influence is notable but without ever supplanting the local culture (the kit is partially present); "trading outposts" comprising an Urukean enclave; strictly local/indigenous ('Late Chalcolithic') sites where the Urukean influence is weak.

It might be added that an interpretation of the relations of this period as center-periphery interaction, although often relevant, risks leading researchers to see decisions in an asymmetric or diffusionist fashion, and this needs to be nuanced. Thus, it increasingly appears that the regions neighboring Lower Mesopotamia did not wait for the Urukians in order to begin an advanced process of increasing social complexity or urbanization, as the example of the large site of Tell Brak in Syria shows, which encourages us to imagine the phenomenon from a more 'symmetrical' angle.

Indeed, at Tell Brak, we find that this city developed as an urban center slightly earlier than the better known cities of southern Mesopotamia, such as Uruk.

== Technology and economy ==
The 4th millennium BC saw the appearance of new tools which had a substantial impact on the societies that used them, especially in the economic sphere. Some of them, although known in the preceding period, only came into use on a large scale at this time. The use of these inventions produced economic and social changes in combination with the emergence of political structures and administrative states.

=== Agriculture and pastoralism ===
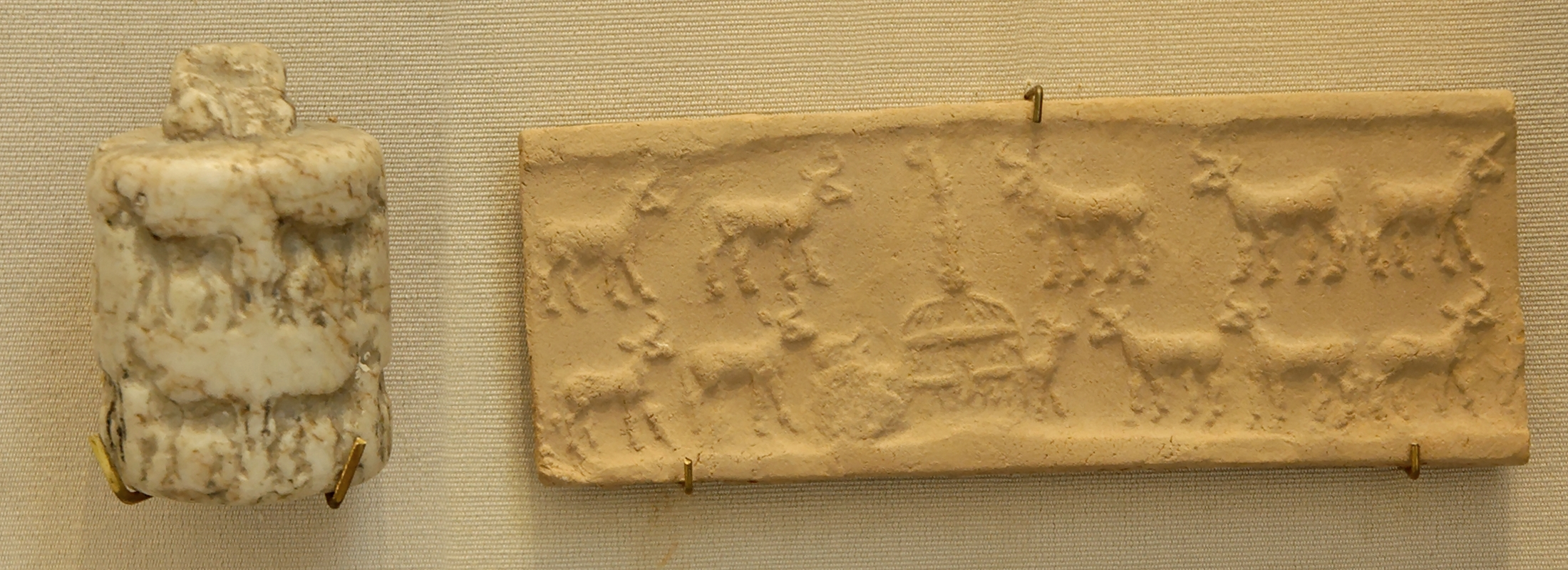
Cylinder seal and impression: cattle herd at the cowshed. White limestone, Mesopotamia, Uruk period (4100 BC – 3000 BC).

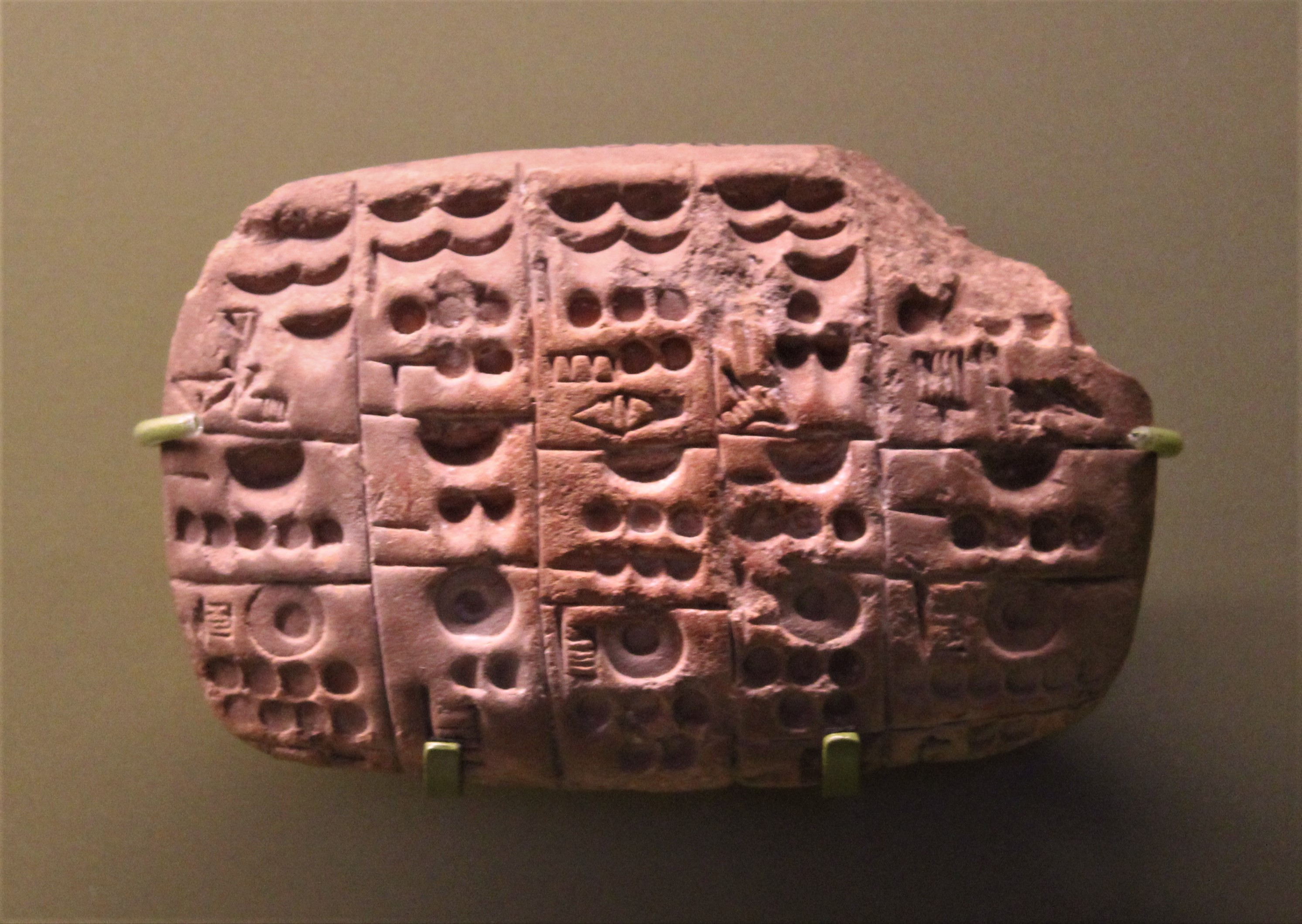
Administrative tablet from Jemdet Nasr, Ashmolean Museum. Calculation and addition of the areas of five fields. Each column concerns one of the five fields, the areas are added together and then divided into three parts; two parts (i.e. 2/3 of the area) are allocated to the EN ("Lord"), a high official (or even the head of the state), and the remainder (1/3) is distributed among five other important figures, one of whom may be the EN's wife (SAL.EN). The lengths given for the fields indicate that they have an elongated shape.

In the agricultural sphere, it is often supposed that several important innovations were made between the end of the Ubayd period and the Uruk period, which have some times been referred to as a 'Second Agricultural Revolution' (the first being the Neolithic Revolution). This period would have seen the development of irrigated agriculture in Lower Mesopotamia, with the widespread use of the ard—a wooden plough pulled by an animal (ass or ox)—and terracotta sickles, creation of long rectangular fields suited for being worked in furrows, each bordered by a little irrigation channel. According to several reconstructions such as those of G. Algaze (a south Mesopotamian "comparative/competitive advantage" based largely on its agricultural yields) or M. Liverani (the hoarding of agricultural surpluses by temples through the exploitation of their workers), the capacity of Mesopotamian agriculture of this period to produce surpluses was a determining factor in political and social developments of the period. However, new studies are tending to change this view. The landscape of southern Mesopotamia during the Uruk period was probably less arid than previously thought, more marshy, and did not yet require a complex irrigation system. The differences in the scale of production between northern and southern Mesopotamia were probably not very significant, as evidenced by the fact that both regions experienced early proto-urbanism. Around Tell Brak, agriculture was diversified and underwent significant intensification during the second half of the 4th millennium. In the south, evidence from the Jemdet Nasr period, mainly texts, indicates that substantial changes had occurred during the same period, such as the emergence of large-scale centralized production, storage, and redistribution of cereals, with high yields already in at least some fields, combined with the development of date palm, vegetable, and fruit cultivation. Specialized pastoralism also emerged around the urban centers of Upper and Lower Mesopotamia, with large flocks of sheep and goats.

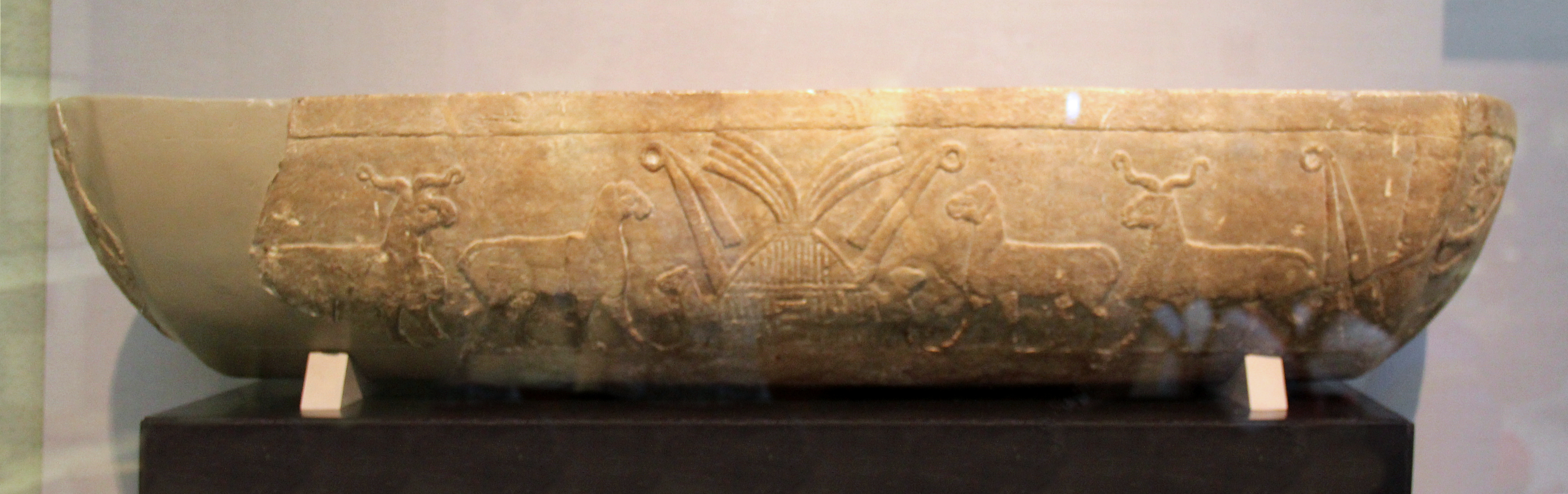
The Uruk Trough, showing cattle and a stable. Circa 3300-3000 BC, British Museum

=== Woolworking ===
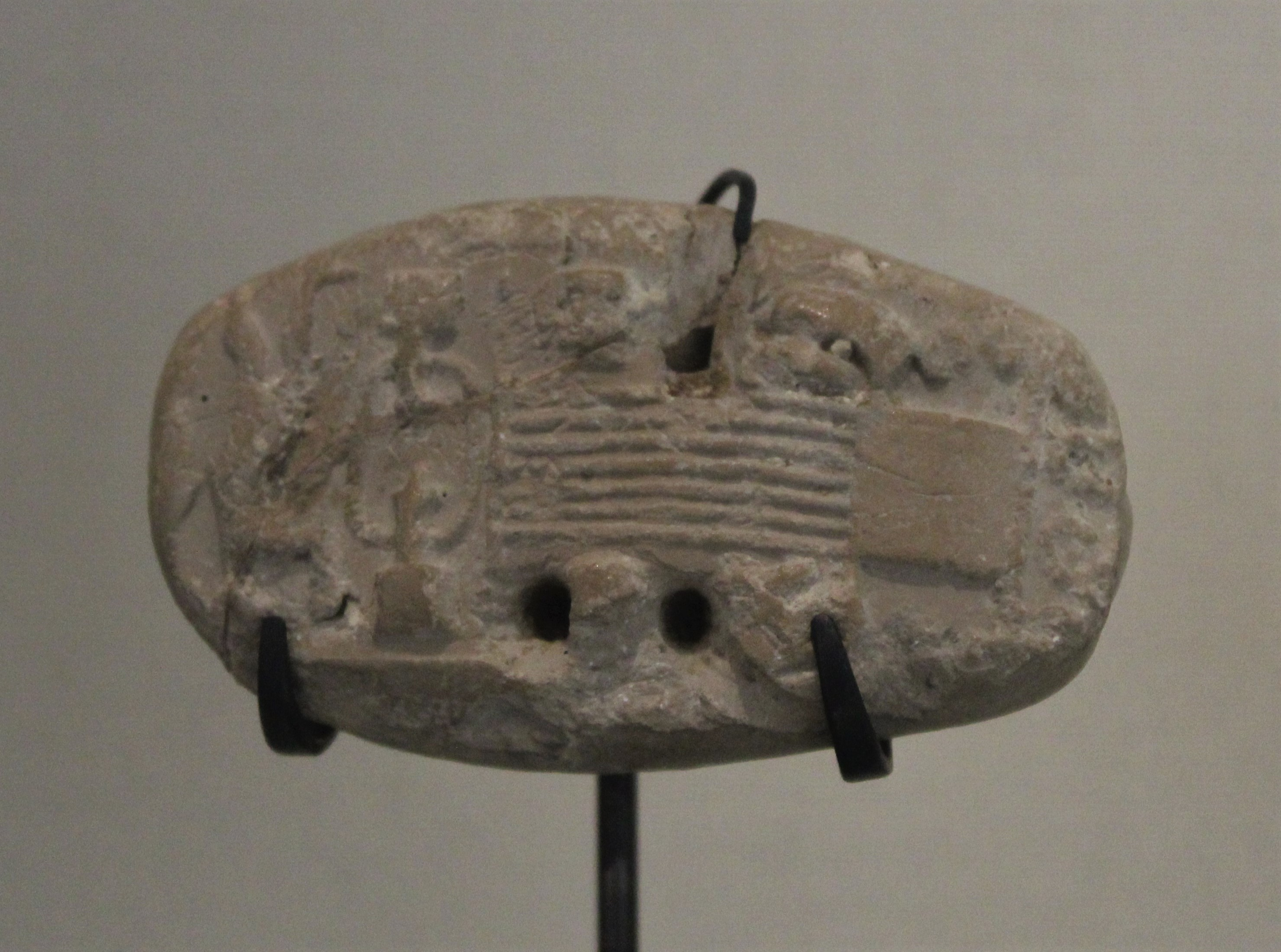
Numerical accounting tablet with seal impression depicting a weaving scene. Susa, Late Uruk. Louvre Museum.

The development of woolworking, which increasingly replaced linen in the production of textiles, had important economic implications. Beyond the expansion of sheep farming, these were notably in the institutional framework, which led to changes in agricultural practice with the introduction of pasturage for these animals in the fields, as convertible husbandry, and in the hilly and mountainous zones around Mesopotamia (following a kind of transhumance). The relative decline in the cultivation of flax for linen freed land for the growth of cereals as well as sesame, which was introduced to Lower Mesopotamia at this time and was a profitable replacement for flax since it provided sesame oil. Subsequently, this resulted in the development of an important textile industry, attested by many cylinder-seal impressions. This too was largely an institutional development, since wool became an essential element in the maintenance rations provided to workers along with barley. The establishment of this 'wool cycle' alongside the 'barley cycle' (the terms used by Mario Liverani) had the same results for the processing and its redistribution, giving the ancient Mesopotamian economy its two key industries and went along with the economic development of large systems. Moreover, wool could be exported easily (unlike perishable food products), which may have meant that the Mesopotamians had something to exchange with their neighbors who had more in the way of primary materials.

On archaeological sites, the presence of textile production is identified by finds of spindle whorls used for spinning, and loom weights, which indicates the presence of weight looms. The latter allow the production of long fabrics, also of more complex patterns than in the past (biased, herringbone, diamonds), and twill thanks to the presence of mobile bars, elaborate weaves attested by iconography. Textile craftsmanship could therefore have experienced technical developments during this period, but this requires confirmation.

=== Pottery ===
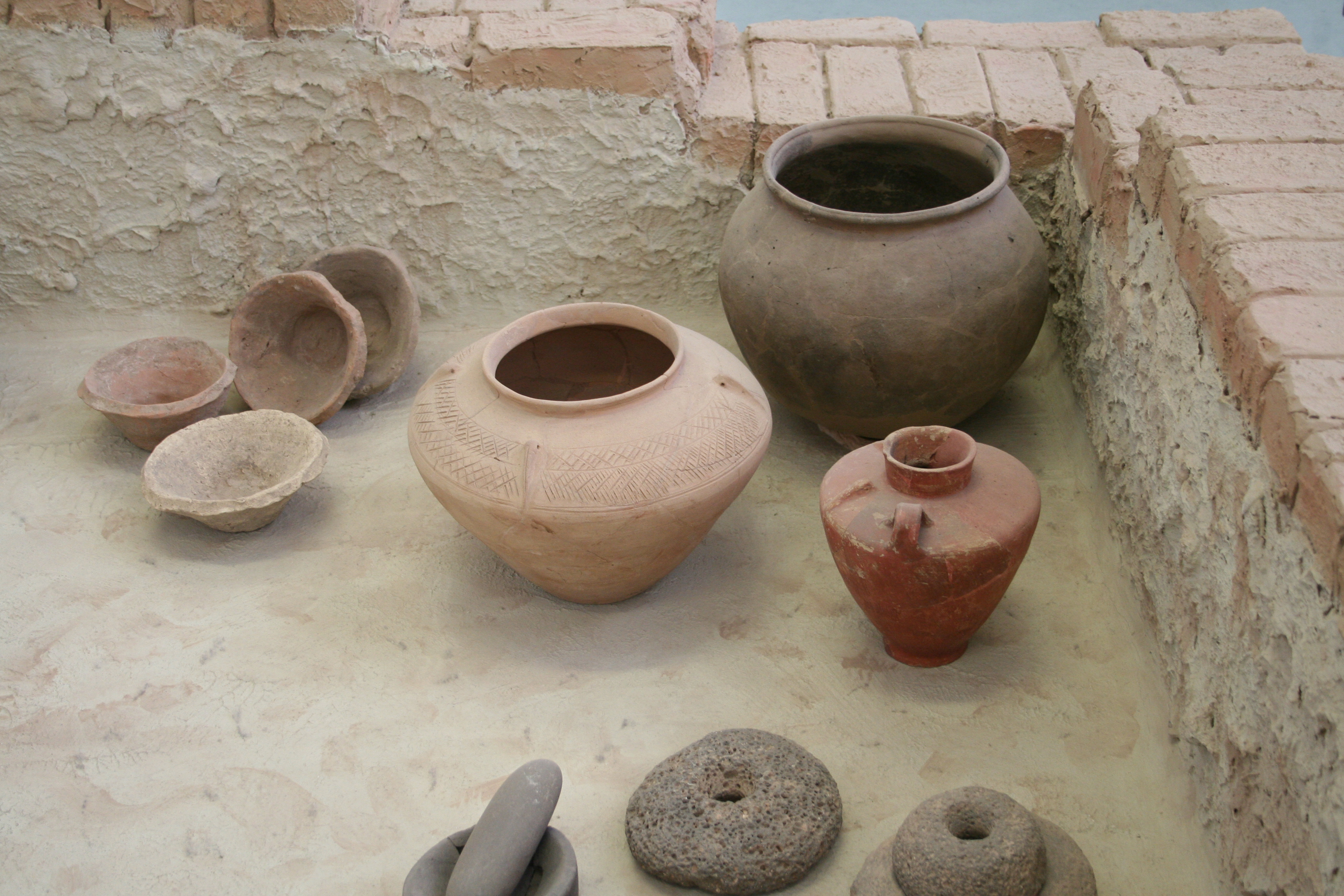
Pottery from the Late Uruk period: wheel-made pottery at right and beveled rim bowls at left, Pergamon Museum.

The production of pottery was revolutionized by the introduction of the potter's wheel in the course of the 4th millennium. As a result of this it was no longer necessary to shape ceramics with the hands alone and the shaping process was more rapid. Potters' kilns were also improved. Ceramics were simply coated with a engobe smoothing their surface, the decoration became less and less elaborate to non-existent; when it remained, it was mainly incisions (lozenges or grids). Painted ceramics became rarer, and only came back in favor during the Jemdet Nasr period. Archaeological sites from this period have yielded a large quantity of ceramics, showing that we had then moved to a stage of mass production, for a larger population, particularly in towns, in contact with large administrative organizations. They fulfilled an essential function of containing different agricultural products (barley, beer, dates, milk, etc.), and therefore invaded daily life. The appearance of artisan potters specialized in this large-scale production dates from this period, which led to the emergence of specialized neighborhoods. Although the quality declines, the diversity of container shapes and modules becomes much greater than previously, with the diversification of functions. Among the characteristic types of the late Urukean repertoire are red slip ceramics, bottles with curved or straight necks, carinated jars with handles, and decorations with incised crosspieces. Not all the pottery of this period was produced on the potter's wheel: the most distinctive vessel of the Uruk period, the beveled rim bowls, were hand-moulded. Mass-produced and probably used for food redistribution in an institutional context, it constitutes approximately 80% of the ceramics excavated from the period.

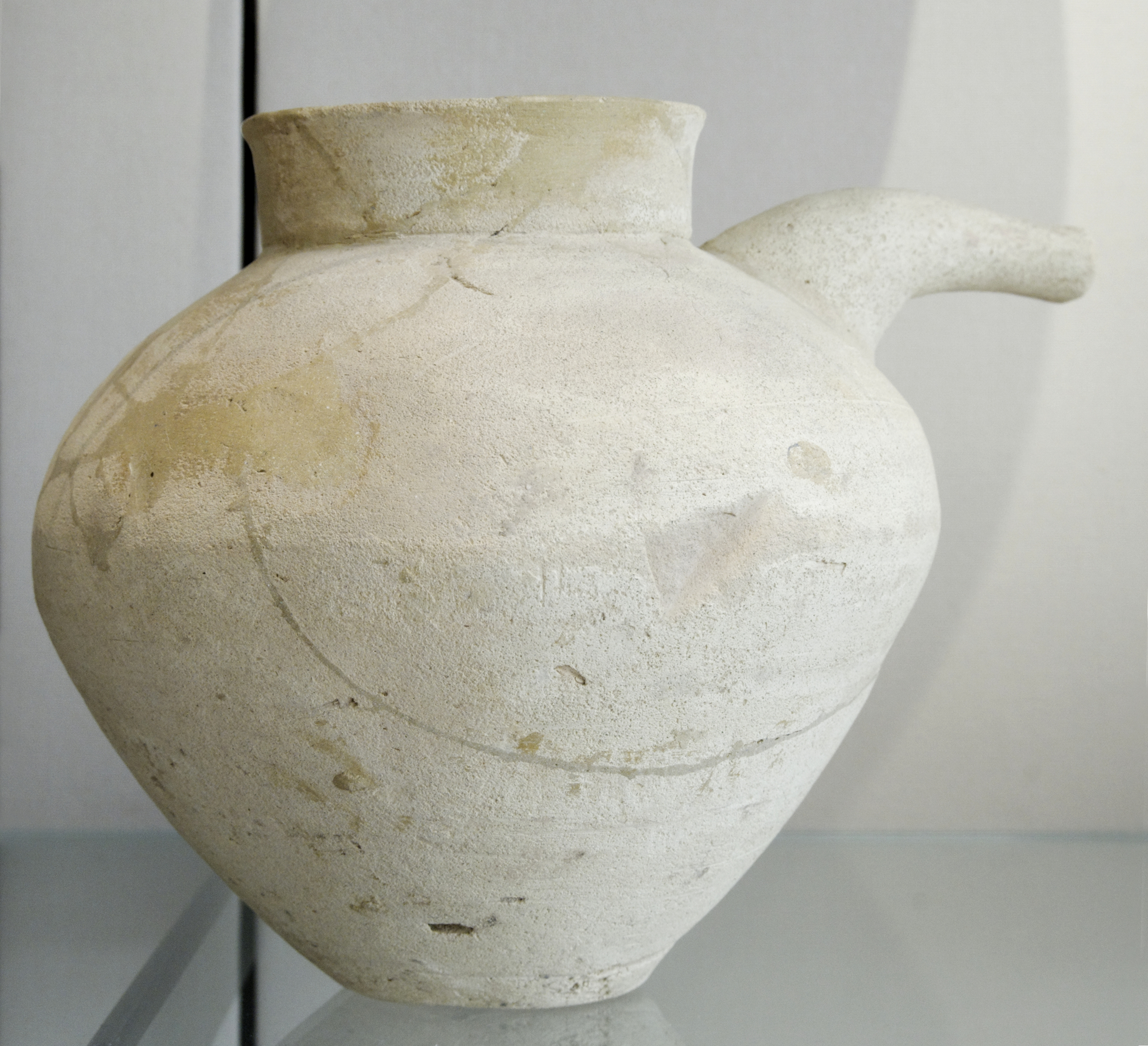
Uruk period vase. Terracotta, ca. 3500–2900 BC. From Telloh, ancient city of Girsu. Louvre Museum.

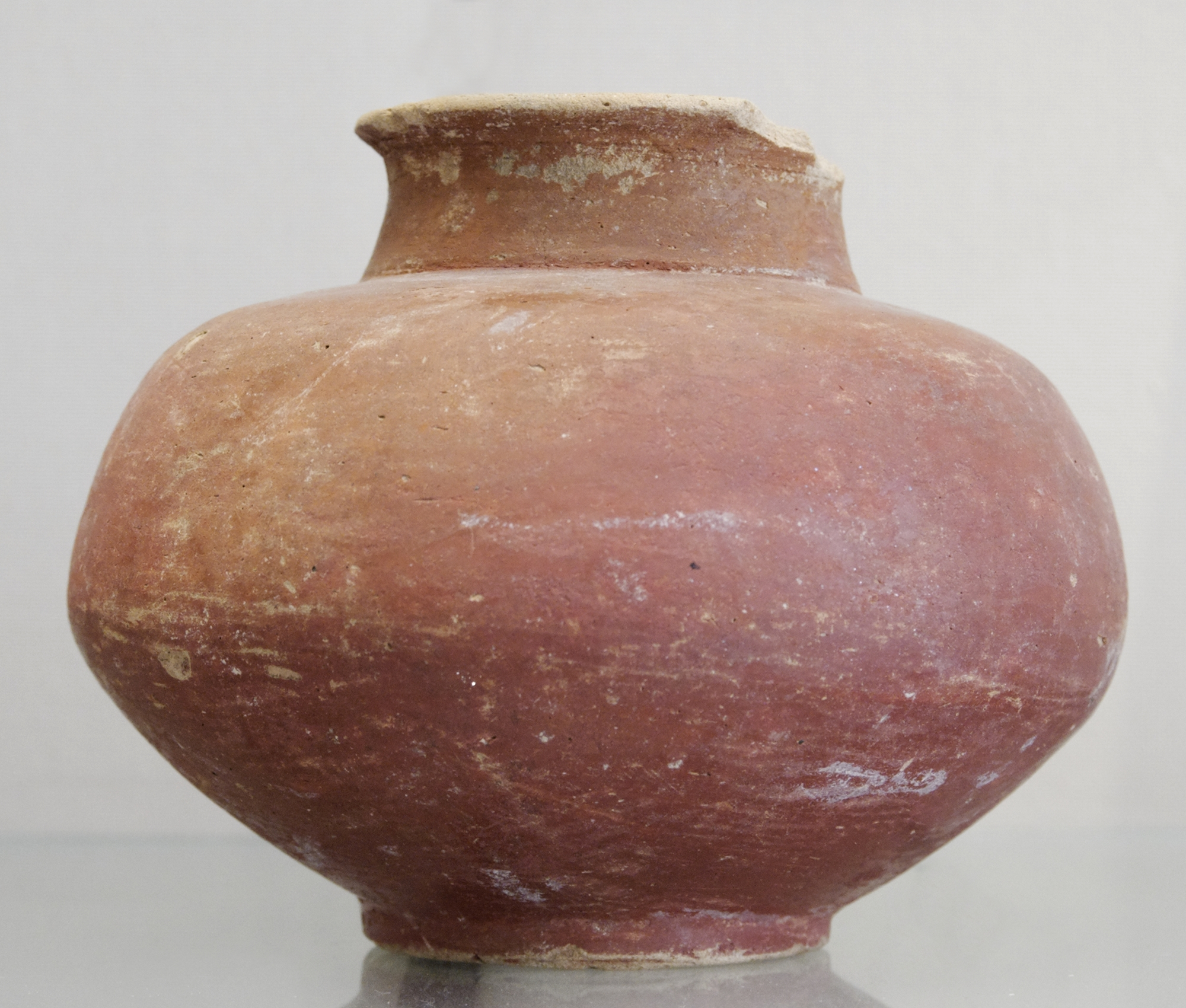
Vase. Terracotta with red slip, ca. 3500–2900 BC. From Telloh, ancient city of Girsu. Louvre Museum.

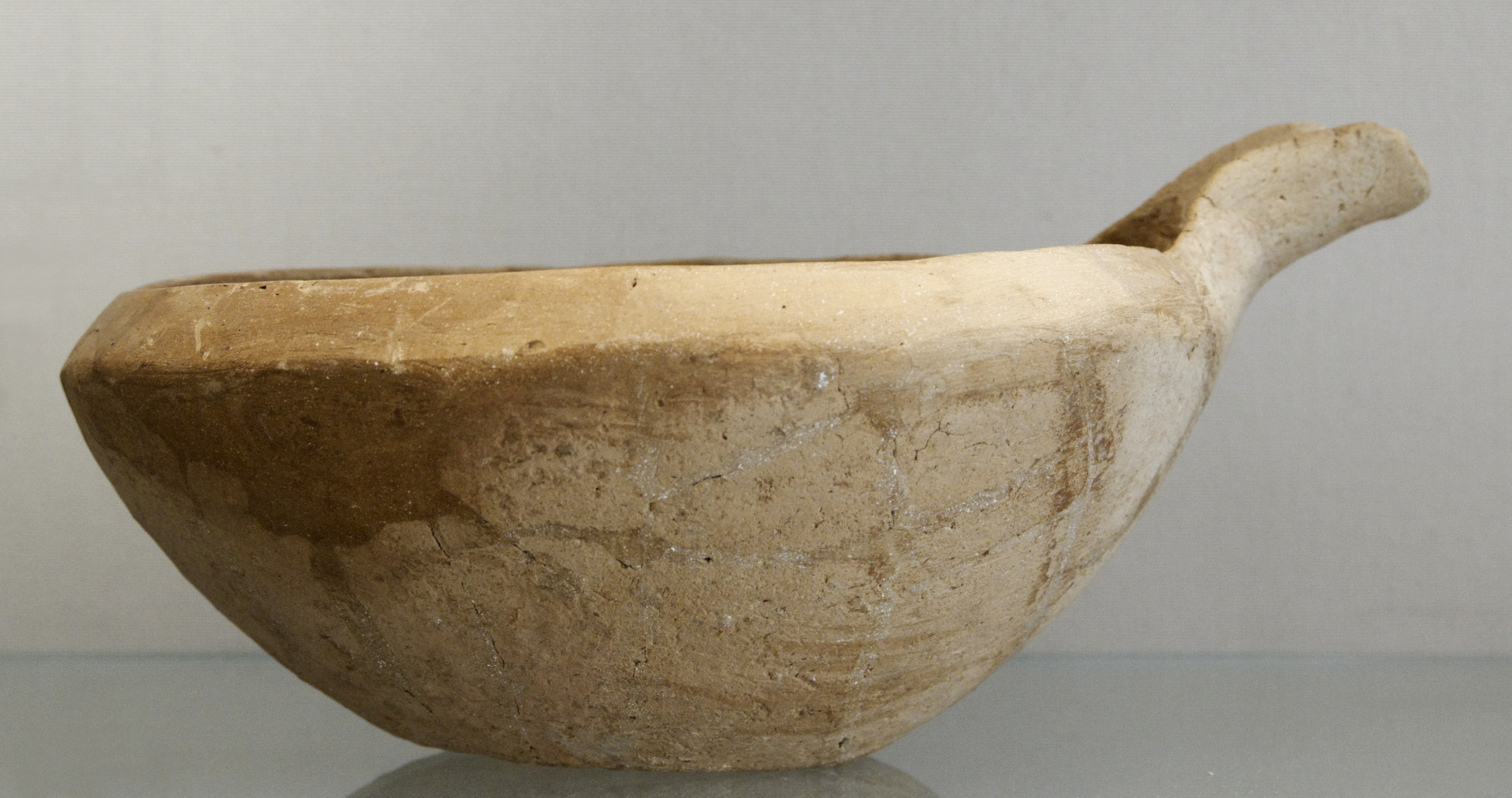
Vase. Terracotta, ca. 3500–2900 BC. From Telloh, ancient city of Girsu.

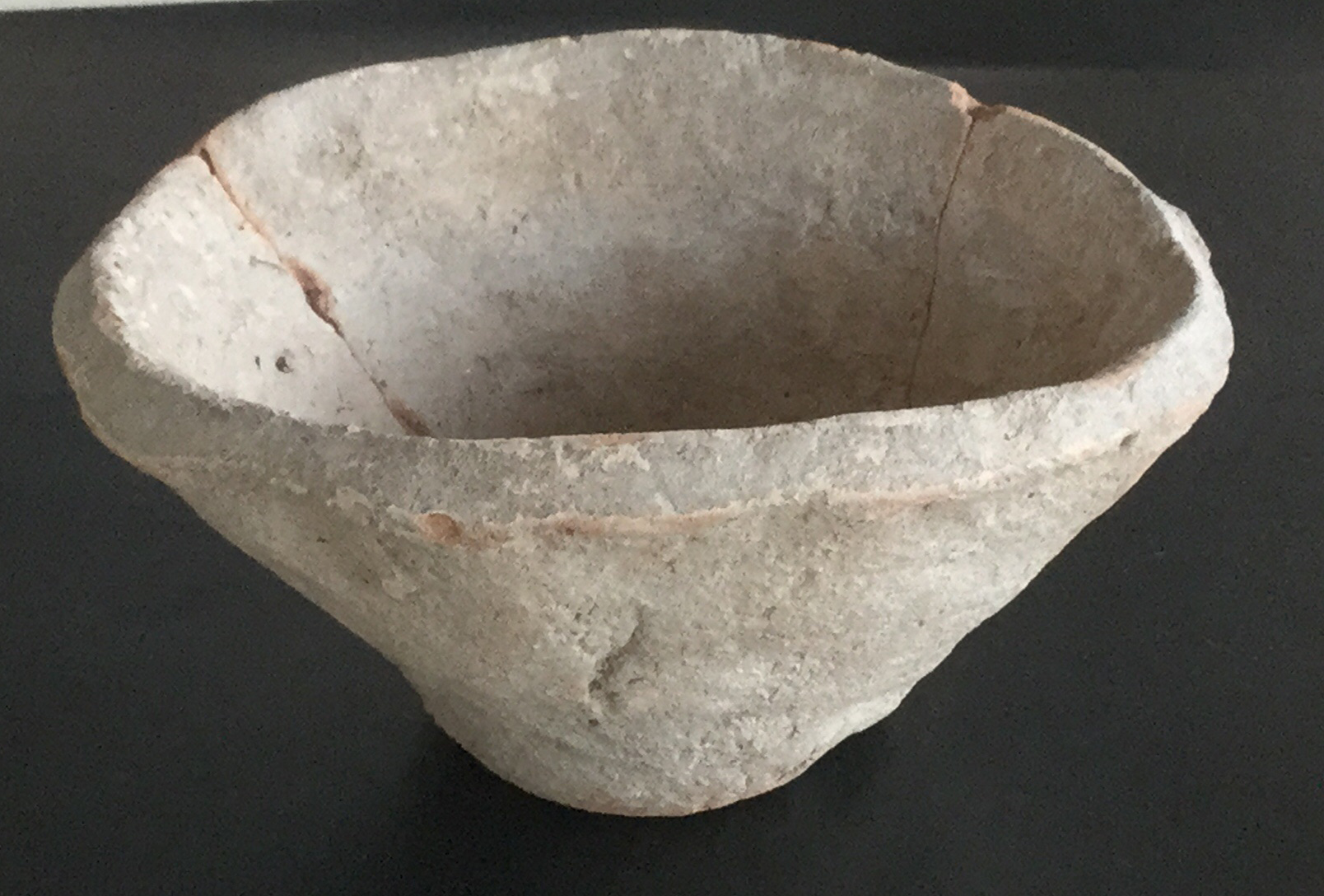
Uruk period beveled rim bowl from Habuba Kabira South (Syria), ca. 3400–3200. University of Mainz, Germany

=== Metallurgy ===
Metallurgy also seems to have developed further in this period, but very few objects survive. The preceding Ubayd period marked the beginning of what is known as the Chalcolithic or Copper Age, with the beginning of production of copper objects. The metal objects found in the sites of the 4th millennium BC are thus above all made with copper, and some alloys appear towards the end of the period, the most common being that of copper and arsenic (arsenical bronze), the copper-lead alloy being also found, while the tin bronze does not begin to spread until the following millennium (although the Late Uruk period is supposed to be the beginning of the 'Bronze Age'). The development of metallurgy also implies the development of long-distance trade in metals. Mesopotamia needed to import metal from Iran or Anatolia, which motivated the long-distance trade which we see developing in the 4th millennium BC and explains why Mesopotamian metalworkers preferred techniques which were very economical in their use of raw metal.

=== Architecture ===
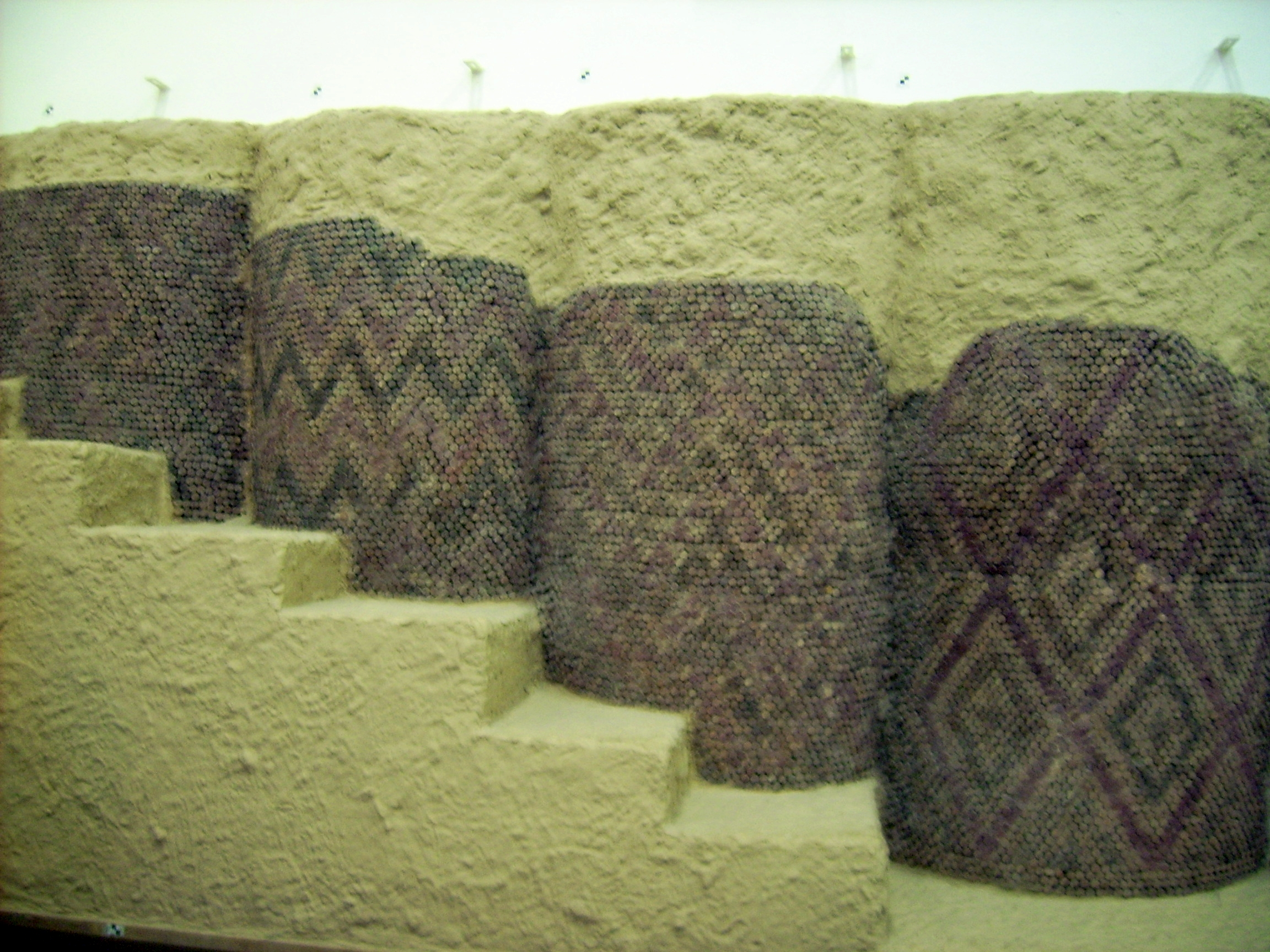
Columns decorated with mosaics, from the archaic Eanna Pergamon Museum

In architecture, the developments of the Uruk period were also considerable. This is demonstrated by the structures created in the Eanna district of Uruk during the Late Uruk period, which show an explosion of architectural innovations in the course of a series of constructions which were unprecedented in their scale and methods. The builders perfected the use of molded mud-brick as a building material and the use of more solid terracotta bricks became widespread. They also began to waterproof the bricks with bitumen and to use gypsum as mortar. Clay was not the sole building material: some structures were built in stone, notably the limestone quarried about 50 km west of Uruk (where gypsum and sandstone were also found). New types of decoration came into use, like the use of painted pottery cones to make mosaics, which are characteristic of the Eanna in Uruk, semi-engaged columns, and fastening studs. Two standardized forms of molded mud-brick appear in these buildings from Uruk: little square bricks which were easy to handle (known as Riemchen) and the large bricks used to make terraces (Patzen). These were used in large public buildings, especially in Uruk. The creation of smaller bricks enabled the creation of decorative niches and projections which were to be a characteristic feature of Mesopotamian architecture thereafter. The layout of the buildings was also novel, since they did not continue the tripartite plan inherited from the Ubayd period: buildings on the Eanna at this time had labyrinthine plans with elongated halls of pillars within a rectangular building. The architects and artisans who worked on these sites this had the opportunity to display a high level of creativity.

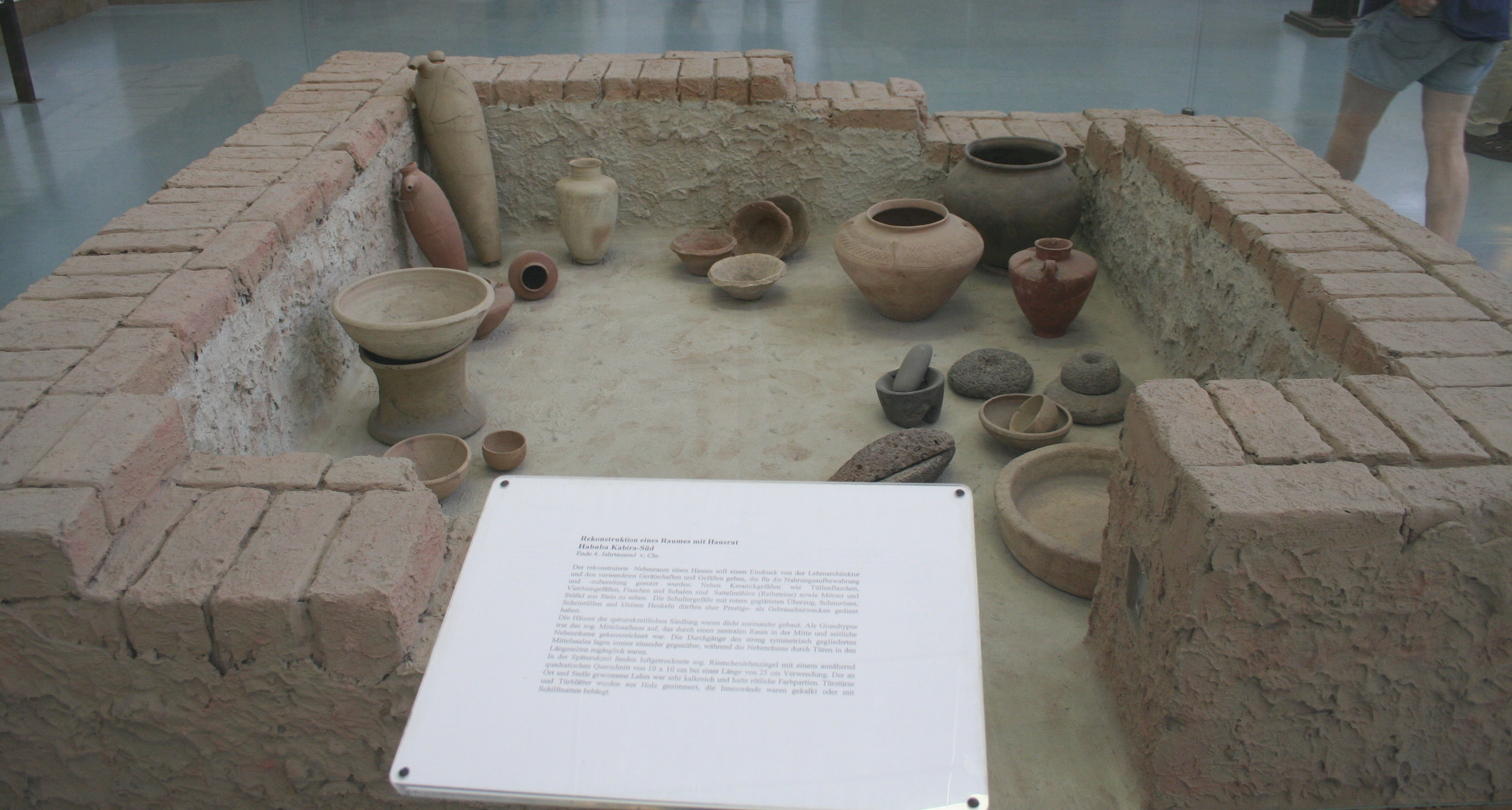
Reconstruction of part of a house from Habuba Kabira, with its mobile property, Pergamon Museum.

The study of houses at the sites of Habuba Kabira and Jebel Aruda has revealed the social evolution which accompanied the appearance of urban society. The former site, which is the better known, has houses of different sizes, which cover an average area of 400 m^{2}, while the largest have a footprint of more than 1000 m^{2}. The 'temples' of the monumental group of Tell Qanas may have been residences for the leaders of the city. These are thus very hierarchical habitats, indicating the social differentiation that existed in the urban centers of the Late Uruk period (much more than in the preceding period). Another trait of the nascent urban society is revealed by the organization of domestic space. The houses seem to fold in on themselves, with a new floor plan developed from the tripartite plan current in the Ubayd period, but augmented by a reception area and by a central space (perhaps open to the sky), around which the other rooms were arranged. These houses thus had a private space separated from a public space where guests could be received. In an urban society with a community so much larger than village societies, the relations with people outside the household became more distant, leading to this separation of the house. Thus the old rural house was adapted to the realities of urban society. This model of a house with a central space remained very widespread in the cities of Mesopotamia in the following periods, although it must be kept in mind that the floor plans of residences were very diverse and depended on the development of urbanism in different sites.

=== Means of transport ===
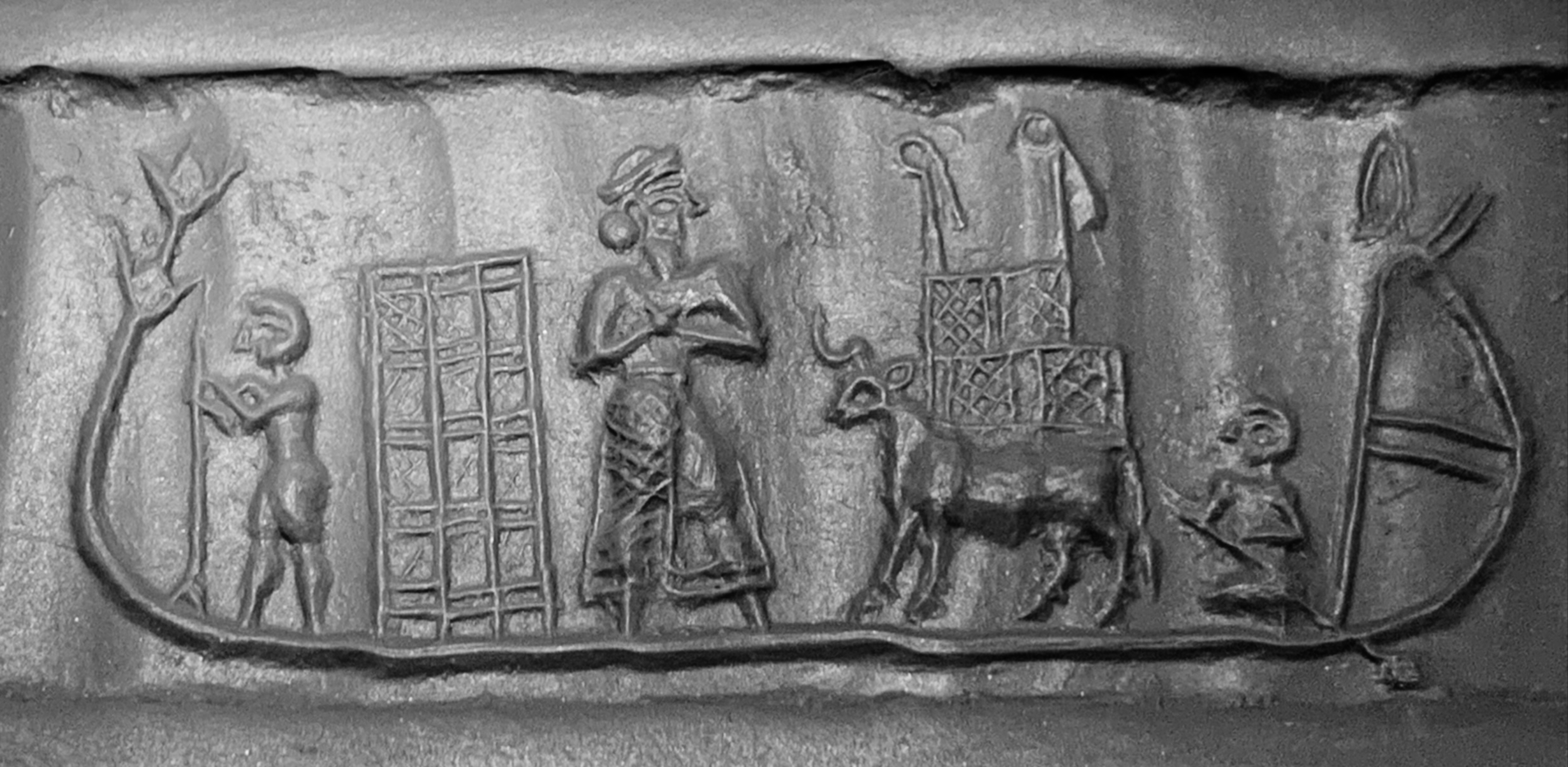
King-priest riding a Late Uruk ship, 3300-3000 BC. Vorderasiatisches Museum Berlin.

A debated question in the realm of transport is whether it was in the Uruk period that the wheel was invented. Towards the end of the Uruk period, cylinder seals depict sleds, which had hitherto been the most commonly depicted form of land transport, less and less. They begin to show the first vehicles that appear to be on wheels, but it is not certain that they actually depict wheels themselves. In any case, the wheel spread extremely rapidly and enabled the creation of vehicles that enabled much easier transport of much larger loads. There were certainly chariots in southern Mesopotamia at the beginning of the 3rd millennium BC. Their wheels were solid blocks; spokes were not invented until c. 2000 BC.

The domestication of the donkey was also an advance of considerable importance, because they were more useful than the wheel as a means of transport in mountainous regions and for long-distance travel, before the spoked wheel was invented. The donkey enabled the system of caravans that would dominate trade in the Near East for the following millennia, but this system is not actually attested in the Uruk period.

For transport at the local and regional level in Lower Mesopotamia, boats made from reeds and wood were crucial, on account of the importance of the rivers for connecting places and because they were capable of carrying much larger loads than land transport.

=== Trade ===
Since southern Mesopotamia lacked natural resources, it had to import materials such as hard stones, metals, and timber. The exact origin of these materials is often difficult to determine due to a lack of studies, but the importance of trade in the dynamics of the Uruk period is generally emphasized: the network of outposts discovered in neighboring regions extended along the main communication routes, particularly rivers, joining the regions where the most important resources were found (Anatolia, the Iranian plateau). The mechanisms behind this long-distance trade remain largely obscure.

== Society and administration ==
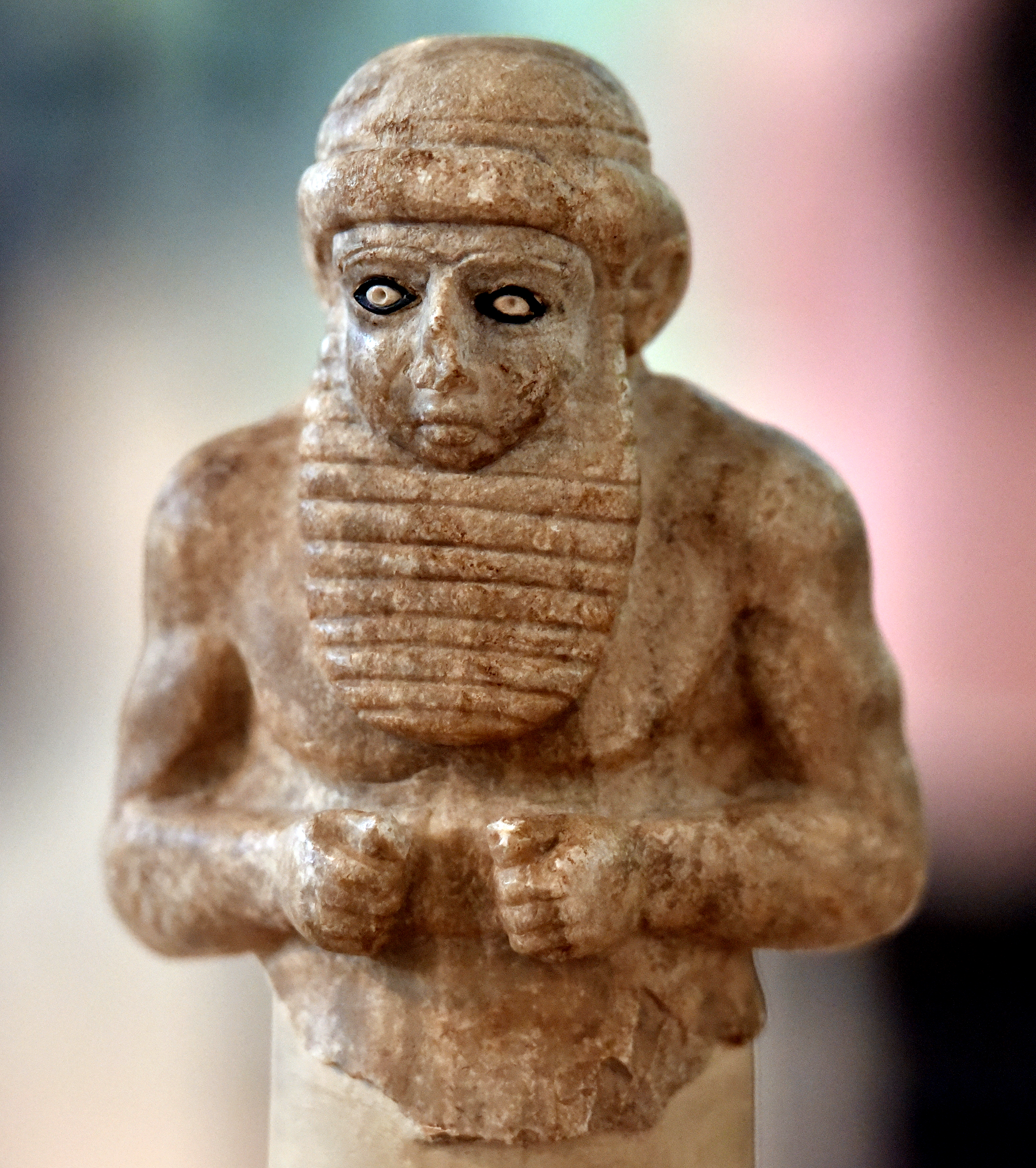
Sumerian dignitary, Uruk, circa 3300-3000 BCE. National Museum of Iraq.

The 4th millennium BC saw a new stage in the political development of Near Eastern society after the Neolithic: political power grew stronger, more organized, more centralized, and more visible in the use of space and in art, culminating in the development of a true state by the end of the period. This development came with other major changes: the appearance of the first cities and of administrative systems capable of organizing diverse activities. The causes and means by which these developments occurred and their relationship to one another are the subject of extensive debate.

=== State formation ===
The Uruk period provides the earliest signs of the existence of states in the Near East, a process of "state formation," at least during the Late Uruk. This phenomenon is observed in Lower Mesopotamia, especially at Uruk, but can also be identified in Susiana and northern Mesopotamia.

For these periods, a 'state' can be understood as a form of government controlling a territory, defending it, and sometimes attempting to expand it, an authority acting as a mediator between the various societal forces under its power. It is also organizing labor, mostly agricultural (or, in a pessimistic view, extorting it and alienating dependent workers). According to modern standards, the degree of control of the population and the territory is relatively weak, in contrast to what the official ideology proclaims. In the documentation, these first states can be identified by: their social stratification, making it possible to distinguish a ruling elite, visible in particular in archeology by the presence of monumental architecture (and also in general imposing tombs, but this is not the case in Mesopotamia); an art reflecting its ideology; a hierarchical settlement network, dominated by a main city, implying a form of centralization of activities; the existence of a specialization of activities and an organization of production, storage and exchanges; ritual practices and worship organized by elites.

The kind of political organization that existed in the Uruk period is debated, and its internal organization (monarchy? oligarchy? assembly? heterarchy?) is virtually unknown. No evidence supports the idea that this period saw the development of a kind of 'proto-empire' centered on Uruk. It may be best to understand an organization in 'city-states' like those that existed in the 3rd millennium BC. This is corroborated by the existence of 'city seals' from the Jemdet Nasr period and the beginning of the Early Dynastic period, which bear symbols of the Sumerian cities of Uruk, Ur, Larsa, etc. The fact that these symbols appeared together might indicate a kind of league or confederation uniting the cities of southern Mesopotamia (and potentially southwestern Iran), perhaps for religious purposes (cult of Inanna?), perhaps under the authority of one of them (Uruk?).

Research into the causes of the emergence of these political structures has not produced any theory that is widely accepted. Research into explanations is heavily influenced by evolutionist frameworks and is, in fact, more interested in the period before the appearance of the state, which was the product of a long process and preceded by the appearance of 'chiefdoms.' This process was not a linear progression but was marked by phases of growth and decline (like the 'collapse' of archaeological cultures). Among the main causes proposed by proponents of the functionalist model of the state are a collective response to practical problems (particularly following serious crises or a deadlocks), like the need to better manage the demographic growth of a community or to provide it with resources through agricultural production or trade, alternatively others suggest that it was driven by the need to soothe or direct conflicts arising from the process of securing those resources. Other explanatory models place greater emphasis on competition, rivalry, and individuals' personal interests in their quest for power and prestige. It is likely that several of these explanations are relevant.

=== 'Urban Revolution' ===
The Uruk period saw some settlements achieve a new importance and population density, as well as the development of monumental civic architecture. They reached a size and had an internal organization that allowed them to be called 'cities.' Uruk is often labelled "the first city", since it has the most impressive material remains of the period and played at least a major role in the process. This development was accompanied by a number of social changes resulting in what can fairly be called an 'urban' society as distinct from the 'rural' society which provided food for the growing portion of the population that did not feed itself, although the relationship between the two groups and the views of the people of the time about this distinction remain difficult to discern. This phenomenon was characterized by Gordon Childe at the beginning of the 1950s as an 'urban revolution', linked to the Neolithic Revolution and inseparable from the appearance of the first states. This model, which is based on material evidence, has been heavily debated ever since.

The causes of the emergence of cities have been widely discussed. Some scholars explain the development of the first cities by their role as ceremonial religious centers, others by their role as hubs for long-distance trade, but the most widespread theory is that developed largely by Robert McCormick Adams which considers the appearance of cities to be a result of the appearance of the state and its institutions, which attracted wealth and people to central settlements, and encouraged residents to become increasingly specialized. This theory thus leads the problem of the origin of cities back to the problem of the origin of the state and of inequality.

In the Late Uruk period, the urban site of Uruk far exceeded all others. Its surface area, the scale of its monuments, and the importance of the administrative tools unearthed there indicate that it was a key center of power. This transformation was the outcome of a process that began many centuries earlier and is largely attested outside Lower Mesopotamia (aside from the monumental aspect of Eridu). The emergence of important proto-urban centers began at the beginning of the 4th millennium BC in southwest Iran (Chogha Mish, Susa), and especially in the Jazirah (Tell Brak, Hamoukar, Tell al-Hawa, Grai Resh). Excavations in the latter region tend to contradict the idea that urbanization began in Lower Mesopotamia and then spread to neighboring regions; the emergence of an urban center at Tell Brak appears to have resulted from a local process with the progressive aggregation of village communities that had previously lived separately, and without the influence of any strong central power (unlike what seems to have been the case at Uruk). Early urbanization should therefore be thought of as a phenomenon that occurred simultaneously in several regions of the Near East in the 4th millennium BC, though further research and excavation are still required to clarify this process for us.

Examples of urbanism in this period are still rare, and in Lower Mesopotamia, the only residential area excavated is Abu Salabikh, a settlement of limited size. It is necessary to turn to Syria and the neighboring sites of Habuba Kabira and Jebel Aruda for examples of urbanism that are relatively well-known. Habuba Kabira consisted of 22 hectares, surrounded by a wall and organized around important buildings, major streets, narrow alleys, and a group of residences of similar shape, organized around a courtyard. It was clearly a planned city created ex nihilo and not an agglomeration that developed passively from village to city. The planners of this period were thus able to create a complete urban plan and thus had an idea of what a city was, including its internal organization and principal monuments.

=== Social stratification ===
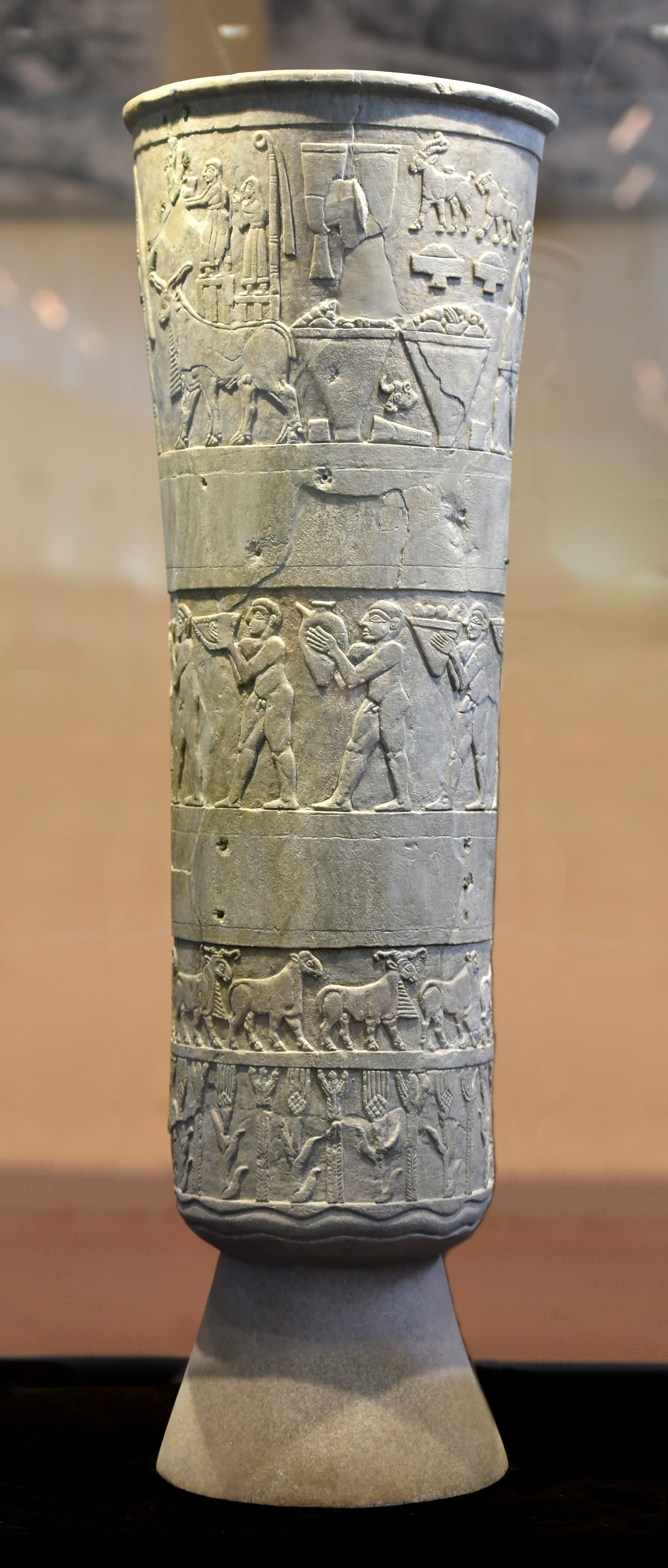
The servants of the first states: porters carrying offerings on the Warka Vase, a great alabaster vase from Uruk, National Museum of Iraq.

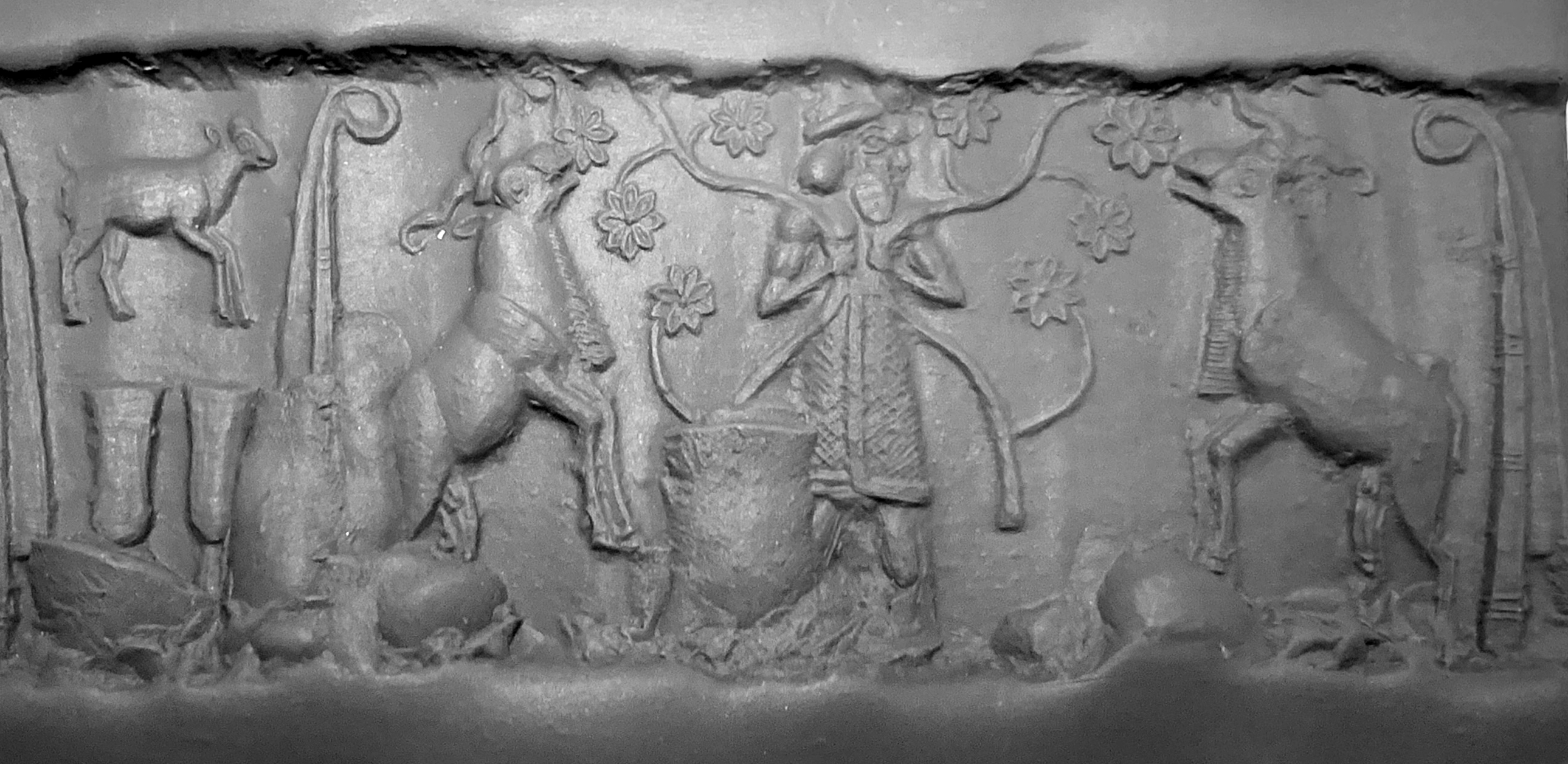
Cylinder seal impression from Uruk, showing a "king-priest" in a brimmed hat and long coat feeding the herd of goddess Inanna, symbolized by two rams, framed by reed bundles as on the Uruk Vase. Late Uruk period, 3300-3000 BC. Pergamon Museum/ Vorderasiatisches Museum. A similar king-priest also appears standing on a ship.

It is clear that there were major changes in the political organization of society in this period. The emergence of the first states and cities is often linked to the increase in social inequalities and social differentiation. As usual for the Uruk period, its Early stages are not documented; it is only possible to study this phenomenon for the Middle and Late periods

The most prominent figure in the Urukean iconography is the so-called "Priest-King" or "Ruler-Priest," an archetypal figure wearing a brimmed cap and a long kilt, with his hair bound up into a bun, which appears in the Uruk V period (ca. 3500-3350 BC). He is mostly found in the Uruk documentation, also in Susa, and even in Egypt on the Gebel el-Arak Knife. On the 'Uruk Vase,' he leads a procession and offering towards the goddess Inanna; on the 'Stele of the Hunt,' he defeats lions with his bow. In seals, he is shown feeding animals, which suggests the king as a shepherd who gathers his people, protects them, and looks after their needs, ensuring the prosperity of the kingdom. These motifs match the functions of the subsequent Sumerian kings: war-leader, chief priest, and builder. In the administrative texts, this ruler may be the person designated by the title of EN. Tell Brak in Upper Mesopotamia is also representative of this phenomenon, but with a different iconography: here the lion seem to be a representation of the royal figure.

The lists of professions and offices of the Late Uruk period provide information on social stratification, as they appear to follow a hierarchical order, and may also be lists of people ruling in an assembly. The people on these lists, who are also attested in administrative documents, probably include high-ranking officials of the administration, such as the one called NAMEŠDA (the 'king'? a ritual leader?); many of them have a title including the word GAL 'Big'/'Chief,' and may therefore be supervisors of various sectors of the administration.

This social and political order relies on ideological foundations, as reflected once again in the art. As the key figure of the "Priest-king" indicates, the elites served as religious intermediaries between the divine and human worlds, notably through sacrificial ritual and festivals they organized, which fulfilled their symbolic function as the foundation of social order. This reconstruction is apparent from the friezes on the great alabaster vase of Uruk, from several cylinder seals, and from administrative texts that mention the transport of goods for ritual use. In fact, according to the Mesopotamian worldview that prevailed in the following period, the gods created human beings to serve them, and the goodwill of the latter was necessary to ensure the prosperity of society.

The workers employed by the institutions were fully or partially dependent, receiving commands and rations from the administrators, as documented in the Late Uruk tablets, which sometimes describe them with detail (age, sex). Some of these workers are probably slaves, designated in the administrative documents by the signs SAL and KUR. They could be war prisoners, but it is impossible to ascertain. What is clear is that they are tightly controlled, described by G. Algaze as 'domesticated' humans, equivalent to domestic animals in the minds of the administrators.

Regarding the relationship between men and women, these developments could have been detrimental to women. With a more stratified society based on patriarchal kinship groups, reproduction would become a more acute problem, resulting in increasing control over women. This could be reflected in art, with the disappearance of the female figurines common during the earlier stages of the Late Neolithic and Chalcolithic (Halaf, Ubaid), as well as anything related to female sexuality and reproduction. Even elite women are rare in the iconographic repertoire, while official art clearly highlights a virile figure, the "Ruler-Priest," associated in the Uruk vase with the goddess Inanna, which empowers this masculine authority. Cylinder seals depict women performing craft activities, especially weaving and churning, which could indicate that they were already particularly involved in these economic activities in domestic and institutional settings, as was the case in Sumer in later periods. But other interpretations are possible, such as the fact that these are representations of high-society women specialized in quality craftsmanship, intended for the production of prestige goods.

=== Development of administration ===
Accounting tokens

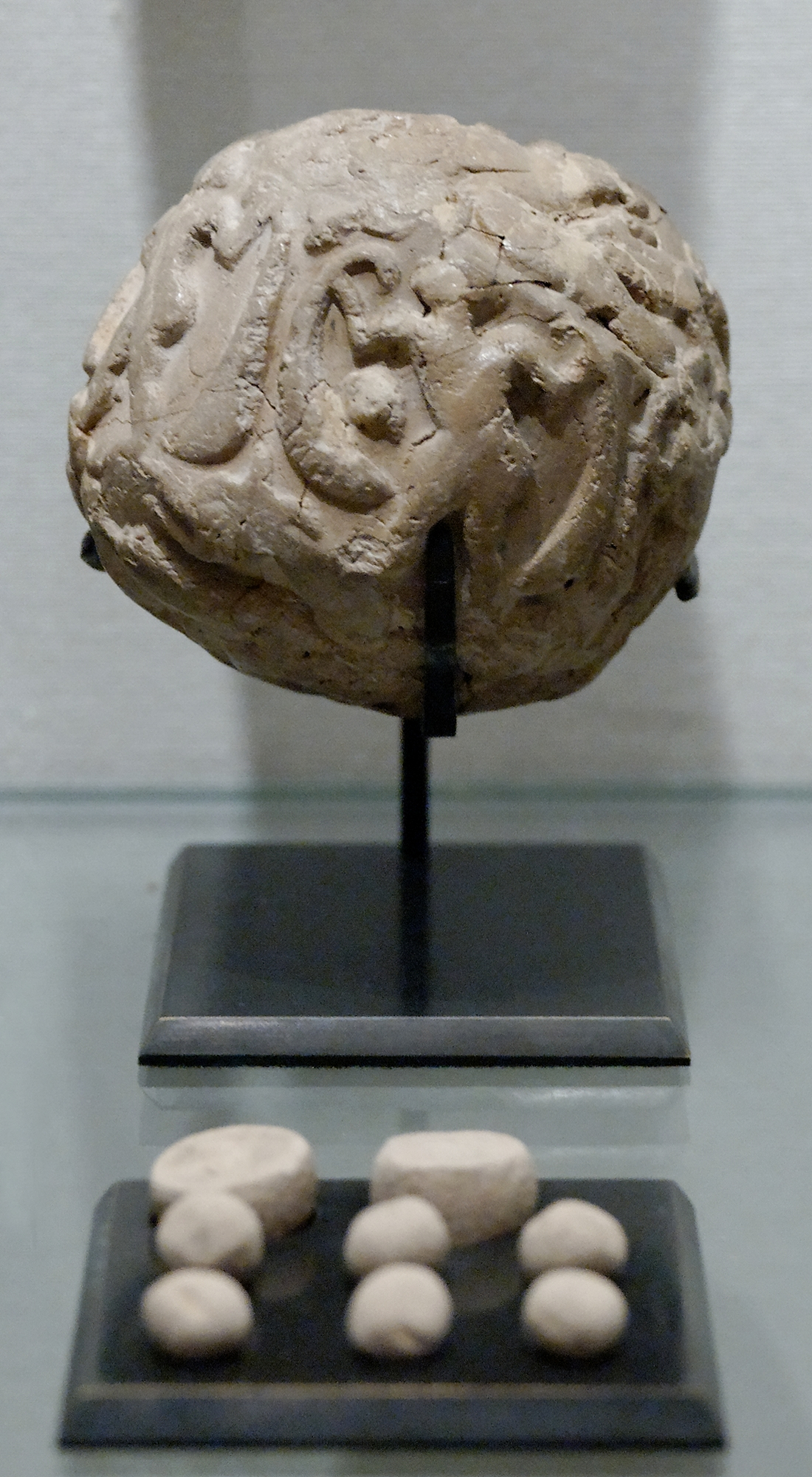
Clay envelope and its tokens. Susa, Uruk period

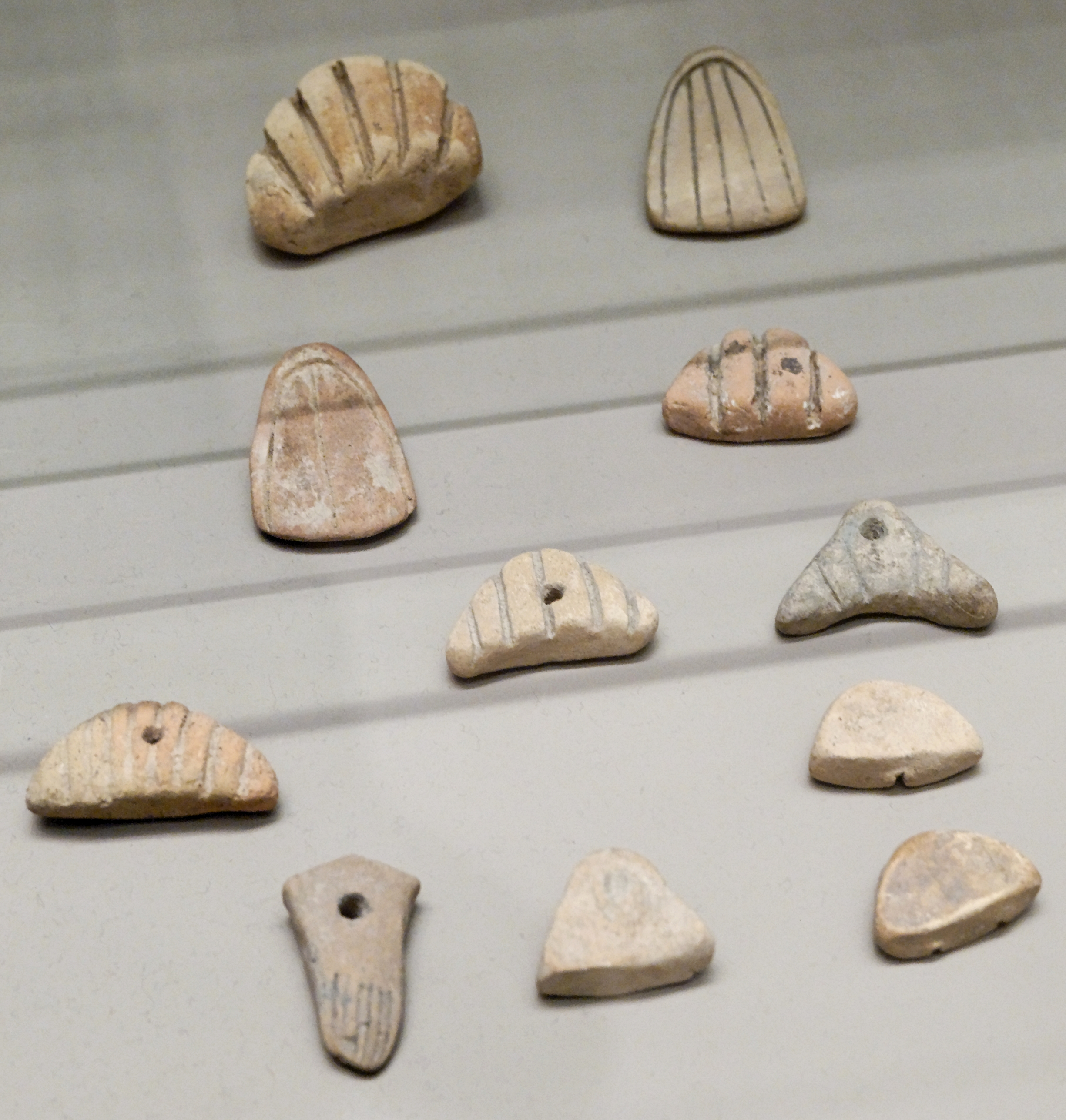
Clay accounting tokens. Susa, Uruk period

The Uruk period, particularly in its late phase, is characterized by the explosion of "symbolic technology": signs, images, symbolic designs, and abstract numbers are used in order to manage a more complex human society efficiently. The emergence of institutions and households with some important economic functions was accompanied by the development of administrative, and later accounting, tools. This was a true managerial and labor 'revolution.' The development of bookkeeping instruments and accounting techniques was accompanied by that of instruments for dividing up time, weights and measures, prices, and therefore various practices of standardization and even planning, formalizing economic relationships, and establishing a "technology of social control" enabling Urukean institutions to better coordinate the use of their resources, and the control of the workers.

Seals were used since the Late Neolithic (ca. 6500-6000 BC) to secure merchandise that had been stocked or exchanged, to secure storage areas, or to identify an administrator or merchant. With the development of institutions and long-distance trade, their use became widespread. In the course of the Middle Uruk period (ca. 3500 BC), cylinder seals (cylinders engraved with a motif that could be rolled over clay to impress a symbol) were invented and replaced simple seals. They were used to seal clay envelopes and tablets, and to authenticate objects and goods, because they functioned like a signature for the person who applied the seal or for the institution which they represented. Sealing became important in many areas of the Near East in the 4th millennium. On the periphery of “Greater Mesopotamia”, Arslantepe witnessed the elaboration of a complex administrative system based on the sealing of cretulae, clay seals applied to close doors and containers.

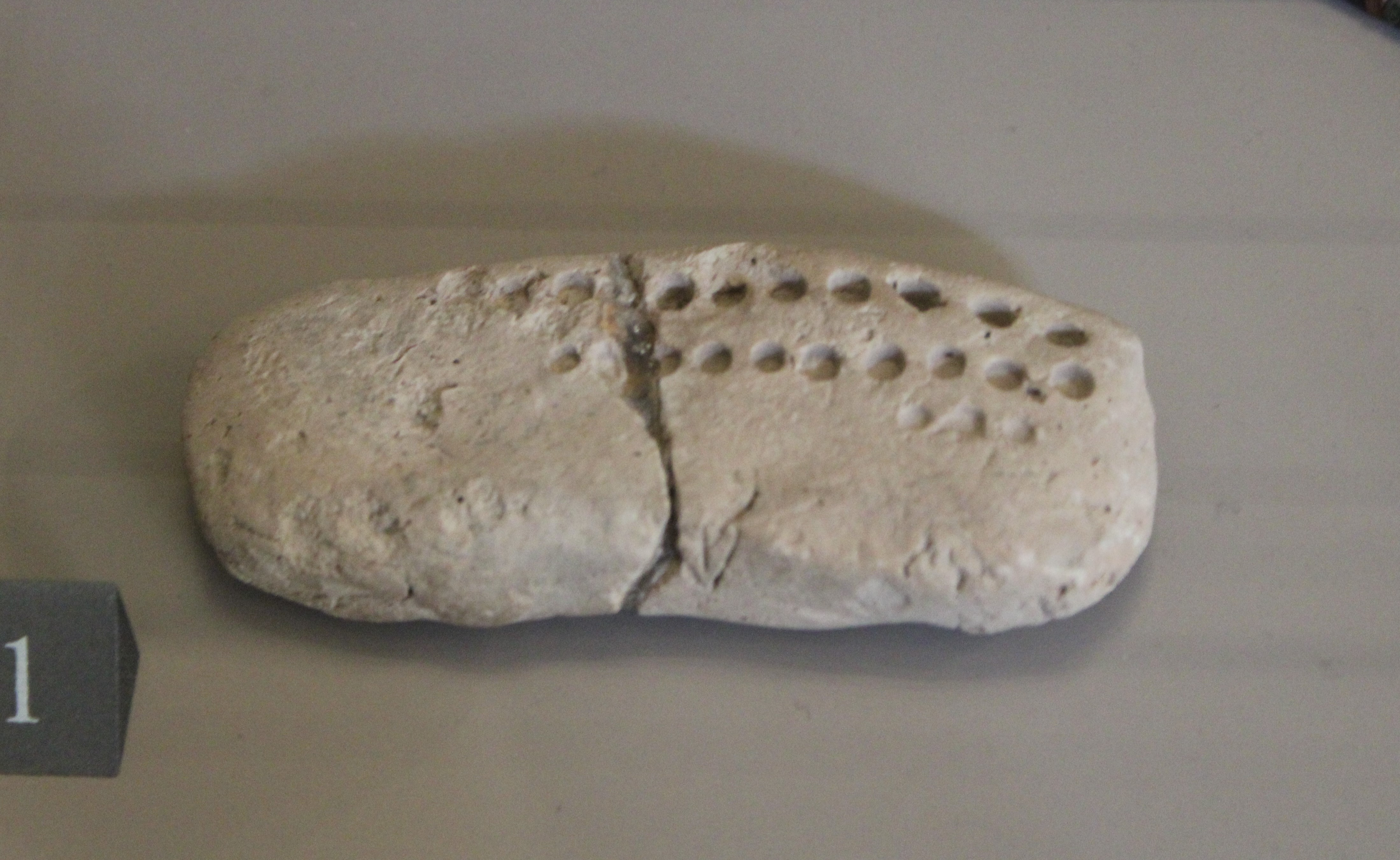
Numerical tablet from Tepe Sialk (Iran), ca. 3500-3350 BC? Louvre Museum.

The Uruk period also saw the development of various accounting tools by the middle of the 4th millennium (Middle Uruk period). Accounting tokens (also referred to as calculi), representing goods that were moved and stored and had to be accounted for, already existed during the Late Neolithic. They improved during the Uruk period to produce more goods, including "complex tokens" of various forms: balls, cones, rods, discs, etc. Spherical clay envelopes (or bullae) containing tokens were created around this period: these are clay balls that contain tokens and could have numerical signs inscribed on their exterior, indicating their contents; the bullae could be broken to verify, with the tokens, the veracity of the numbers inscribed on them. This led slightly later to the creation of numerical tablets, a simplification of the bullae with only the inscription and no tokens, which served as an "aide-mémoire", and then to "numero-ideographical" tablets, adding ideographic signs for goods, a decisive step towards the invention of writing.

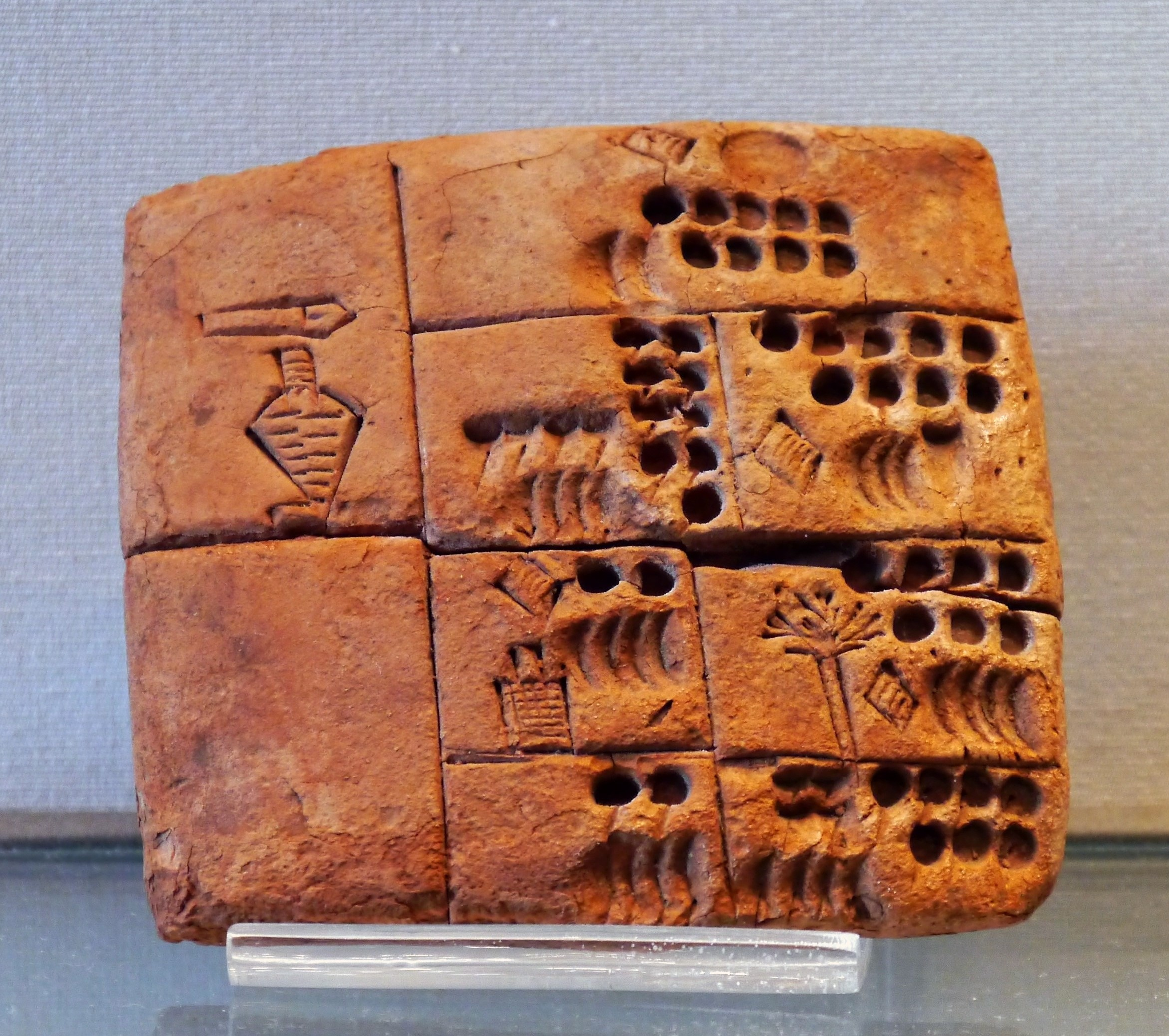
Uruk III administrative tablet (from Uruk?). Accounts of products used to make beer. In the upper left case, the combination of two signs KU.ŠIM seems to designate a person or office in charge of a brewery, because it is found on other tablets accounting for beer and products used in its production. Louvre Museum.

Indeed, "proto-cuneiform", which appeared ca. 3350-3300 BC, probably derived from these older bookkeeping practices, which are often labeled its "precursors". It represented a new management tool that enabled more precise, long-term recording: most of the tablets from the Uruk and Jemdet Nasr periods are administrative, used to record the economic operations of the institutions. The development of these administrative practices necessitated the development of a system of measurement which varied depending on what they were to measure (animals, workers, wool, grain, tools, pottery, surfaces, etc.). They are very diverse: some use a sexagesimal system (base 60), which would become the universal system in subsequent periods, but others employ a decimal system (base 10) or even a mixed system called 'bisexagesimal', all of which makes it more difficult to understand the texts. The system for counting time was also developed by the scribes of institutions in the Late Uruk period.

The high degree of division and control of labor within the Urukean institutions is also reflected in the widespread presence of beveled-rim bowls at sites from this period. These crude, mass-produced vessels have a standardized volume and were probably used to distribute food en masse to workers, whether in the form of grain rations or bread molded inside.

Thus, Late Uruk institutions could control the production of prestige goods, redistribution, long-distance trade, and the management of public works. They were able to support an increasingly specialized workforce. The largest institutions contained multiple 'departments' devoted to a single activity (cultivation of fields, herds, etc.). Nonetheless, there is no proof that these institutions were able to supervise the majority of the population in the process of centralising production. The economy rested on a group of domains (or 'houses' / 'households', É in Sumerian) of different sizes, from large institutions to modest family groups, maybe some of 'private' nature.

== Intellectual and symbolic expressions ==
The developments that society experienced in the Uruk period had an impact on the mental and symbolic realm, which manifested as a number of different phenomena. First, although the appearance of writing was undoubtedly connected to the managerial needs of the first state, it led to profound intellectual changes. Art also reflected a society more heavily shaped by political power, and religious cults grew more impressive and spectacular than previously. The development of religious thought in this period remains very poorly understood.

=== Writing ===
Some proto-cuneiform logographic signs with meaning, examples, Uruk III shapes (drawings by R. Englund.).

The oldest form of writing (or "proto-writing") in the Near East emerged in Mesopotamia, and is often called "Proto-cuneiform" because it is the system from which the cuneiform writing system characteristic of ancient Mesopotamia and the ancient Near East derives. It is mostly written on clay tablets, inscribed with a reed stylus. The oldest tablets come from Uruk; therefore, it is the likely place of invention of this system. Two main chronological groups are distinguished, named from the Eanna quarter where they were first found (in a rubble deposit). The oldest, originally found in Uruk IV strata (Late Uruk period), comprises nearly 2,000 tablets. They date ca. 3350-3200 BC. The second group, Uruk III (contemporary to the Jemdet Nasr period), comprises around 5,000 tablets, mostly found in Uruk, but also from other sites of Lower Mesopotamia such as Jemdet Nasr, Tell Uqair, and Umma, and also from unknown places, attesting the diffusion of the invention. Those texts are dated ca. 3200-3000 BC. Another form of "proto-writing" was used at Susa and in southwestern Iran: Proto-Elamite. It is often seen as a local adaptation of the Proto-cuneiform, therefore a later invention, but it could have been created around the same time.

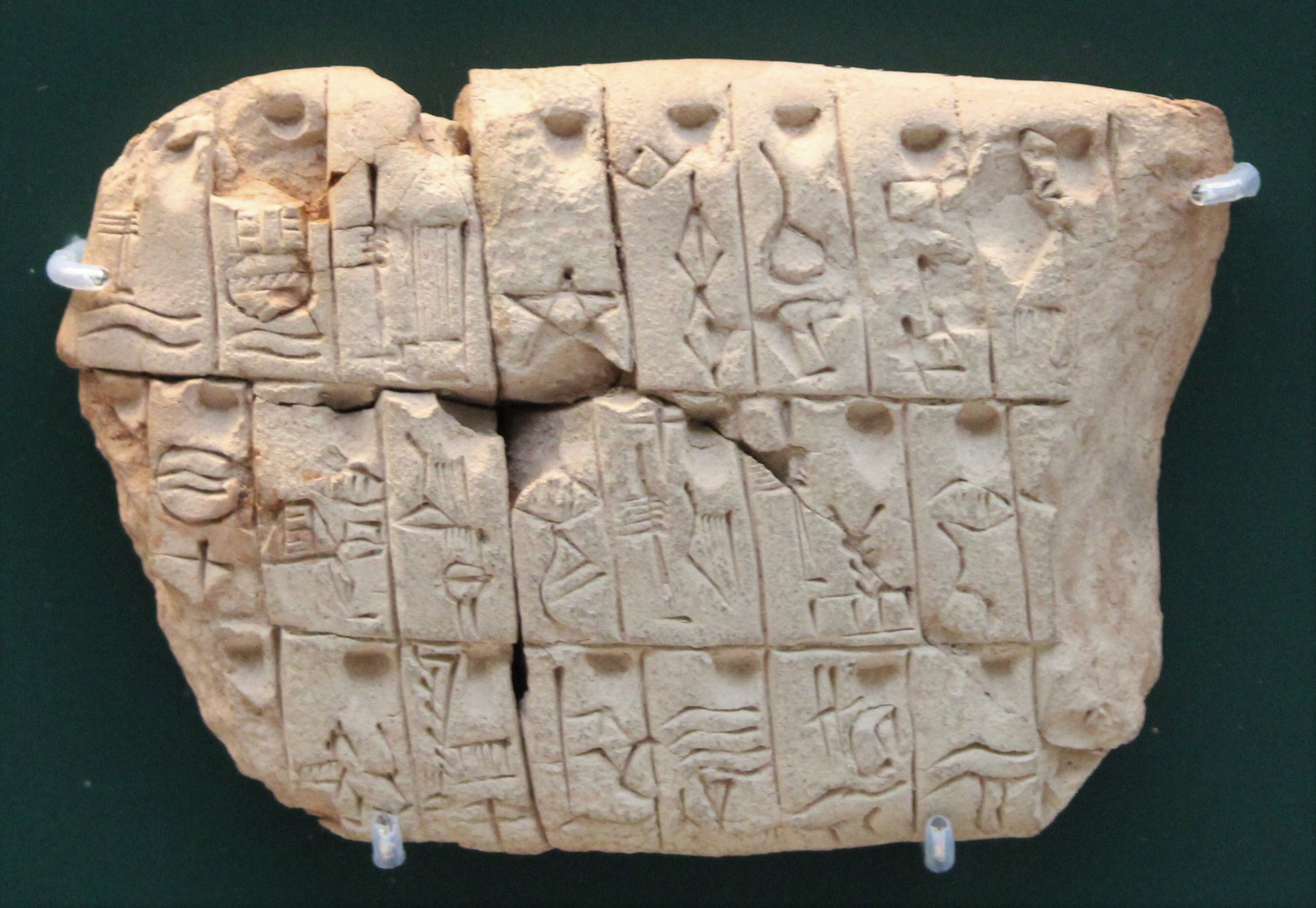
List of cities, Jemdet Nasr. Among the first in the list are well-known cities such as Ur, Nippur, Larsa and Uruk. The order in which they appear could reflect a mythological or cultic hierarchy. British Museum.

It is now widely accepted that proto-cuneiform is primarily an economic tool, developed to record economic transactions and allow their subsequent verification. It can be seen as an improvement over older accounting tools (tokens, clay bullae, numerical tablets, and seals) and as the culmination of numerous attempts to improve accounting methods within Urukean institutions. Its success lies in its greater efficiency (although it did not put an end to the use of the older devices). Proto-cuneiform uses the numerical signs derived from numerical tablets, and adds a new category of signs, ideograms (or logograms), representing objects or words, which number in the hundreds. They are created using pre-existing pictorial and symbolic codes (tokens, seals, works of art) or by drawing a simplified (sometimes partial) representation of an object, a human, or an animal (pictograms). Proto-cuneiform is not a system aimed at transcribing a language: the phonetic use of signs (following the rebus principle) is at best marginal (used for personal names). The texts of this period are predominantly (85-90%) administrative in nature and are found mainly in contexts that seem to be public (institutional offices), rather than private. Alongside administrative texts, lexical lists and lexicographic works of a scholarly type have been discovered from the beginnings of writing. They compile signs according to different themes (lists of people, metals, pottery, cereals, toponyms, etc.) and are to become a characteristic of the later phases of Mesopotamian literary tradition. A notable example is the list of persons (including the ancestor of the "Lú.A" series, known from the 3rd millennium BC), in which various people are identified by title and profession, apparently in hierarchical order. These lexical texts are considered an attempt to compile, codify, and organize the world, thus a first step in the emergence of written speculations. One of them, the “Tribute List,” could even be the first literary text.

=== Visual Arts ===
The Uruk period witnessed a notable renewal, accompanied by substantial changes in the symbolic sphere. The greater complexity of the society and the development of more powerful elites who wanted to express their power and worldview in more diverse ways offered new opportunities to artists who could express themselves in other media. Art, politics, and religion became entangled to support the official ideology.

The artistic canons of the period were clearly more realistic, or at least more realistic, than those of the preceding periods. The human being is at the center of this art. This is notably the case with the cylinder seals and prints of cylinder seals found at Susa (level II), which are the most realistic of the period: they represent the central figure of society as the monarch, but also some ordinary men engaged in everyday life, agricultural and artisanal work (pottery, weaving). This realism indicates a true shift, which might be called 'humanist', because it marks a turning point in Mesopotamian art and more generally a change in the mental universe which placed man or at least the human form in a more prominent position than ever before.

Sculpture took on exceptional importance, whether carved in the round or in bas-relief on stelae and especially on cylinder seals that appeared in the Middle Uruk period. These different media share the same motifs, which are transmitted from one to the other (and also in the Proto-cuneiform system). They are increasingly complex, especially in the Eanna complex at Uruk, and above all by the objects found in the Sammelfund (hoard) of level III of Eanna (Jemdet Nasr period). The 'Warka Vase', an alabaster vase more than 1 meter (3 feet) high, marks the beginning of narrative art in Mesopotamia: a religious procession commemorating the goddess Inanna (a 'sacred marriage'?) is depicted on several registers. It also associates written signs with images for the first time. Other carved vessels were found, as well as carved troughs depicting animals and landscapes ('Uruk Trough'). The 'Mask of Warka' is a life-sized marble female head, maybe a cult statue of the goddess Inanna, in a naturalistic style. It was probably originally part of a complete body. The basalt 'Lion Hunt' stele is a public monument depicting one of the period's favorite motifs: the 'Priest-King' hunting lions. Several statues also represent this figure, as do cylinder seals. A group of several stone animal figurines, some originally inlaid, were also found in the sanctuary, were they were probably consecrated to the gods.

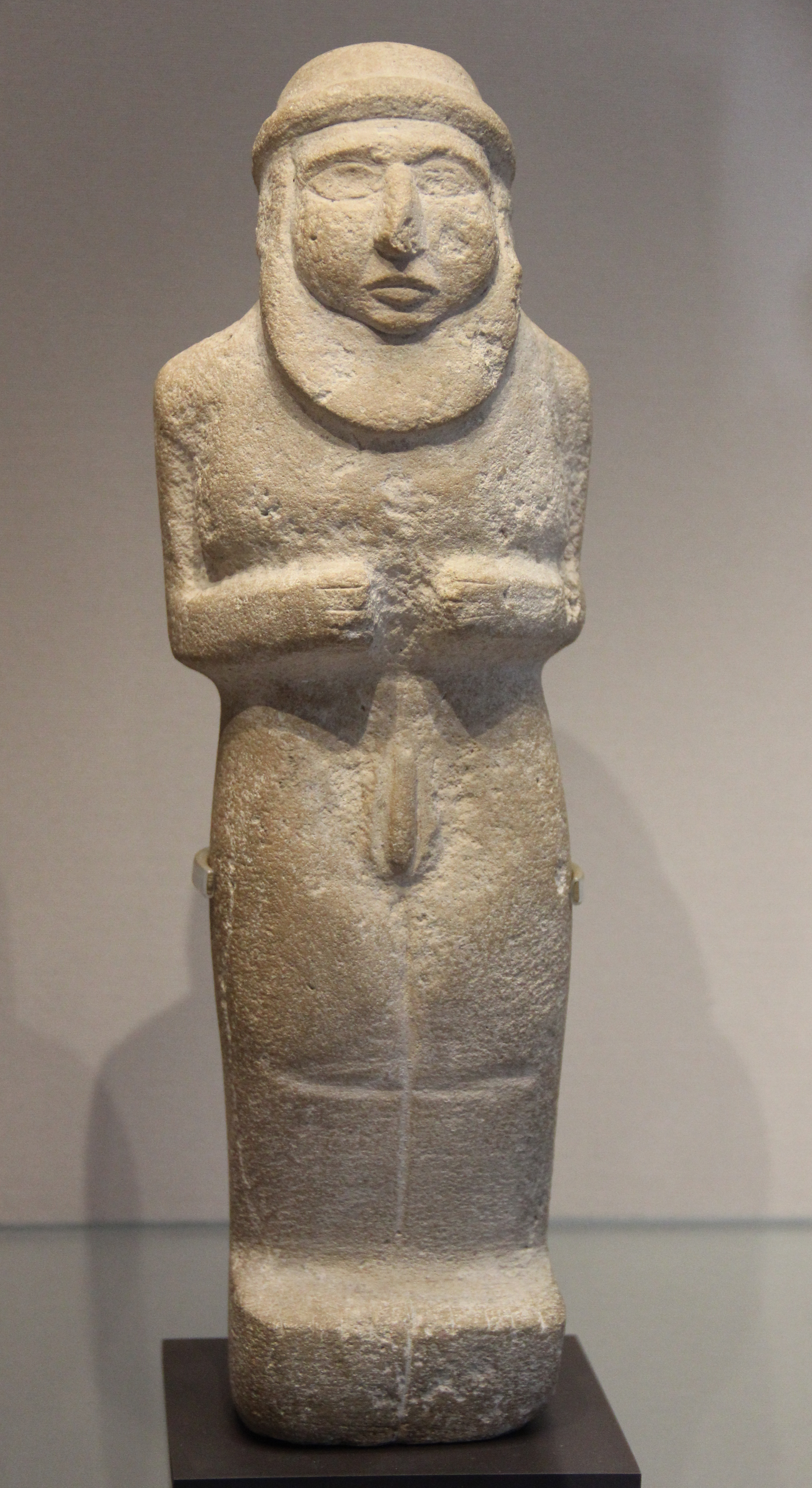
Statuette of the 'Priest-King'. Louvre Museum.

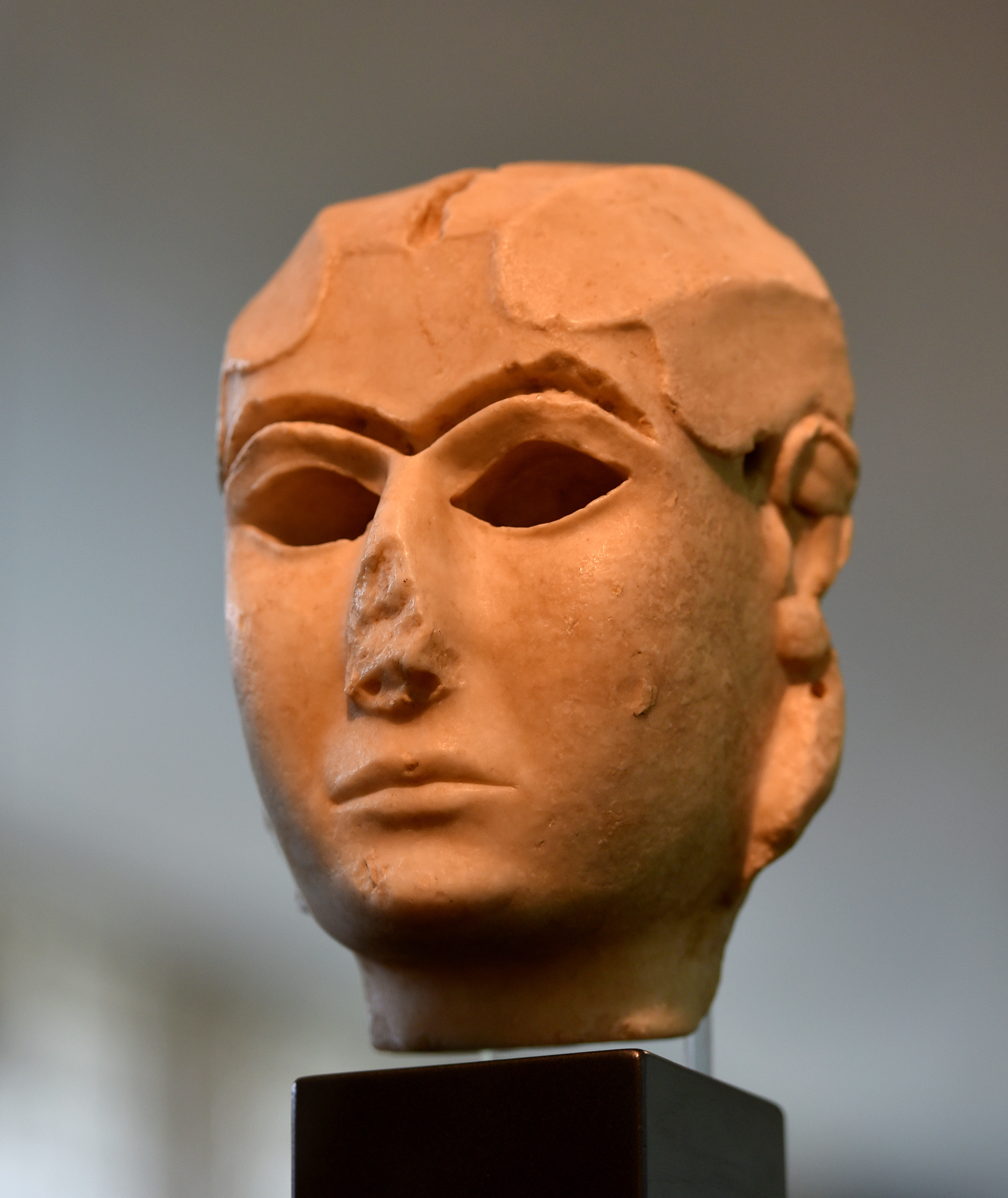
Head of a woman, or 'Mask of Warka'. National Museum of Iraq.

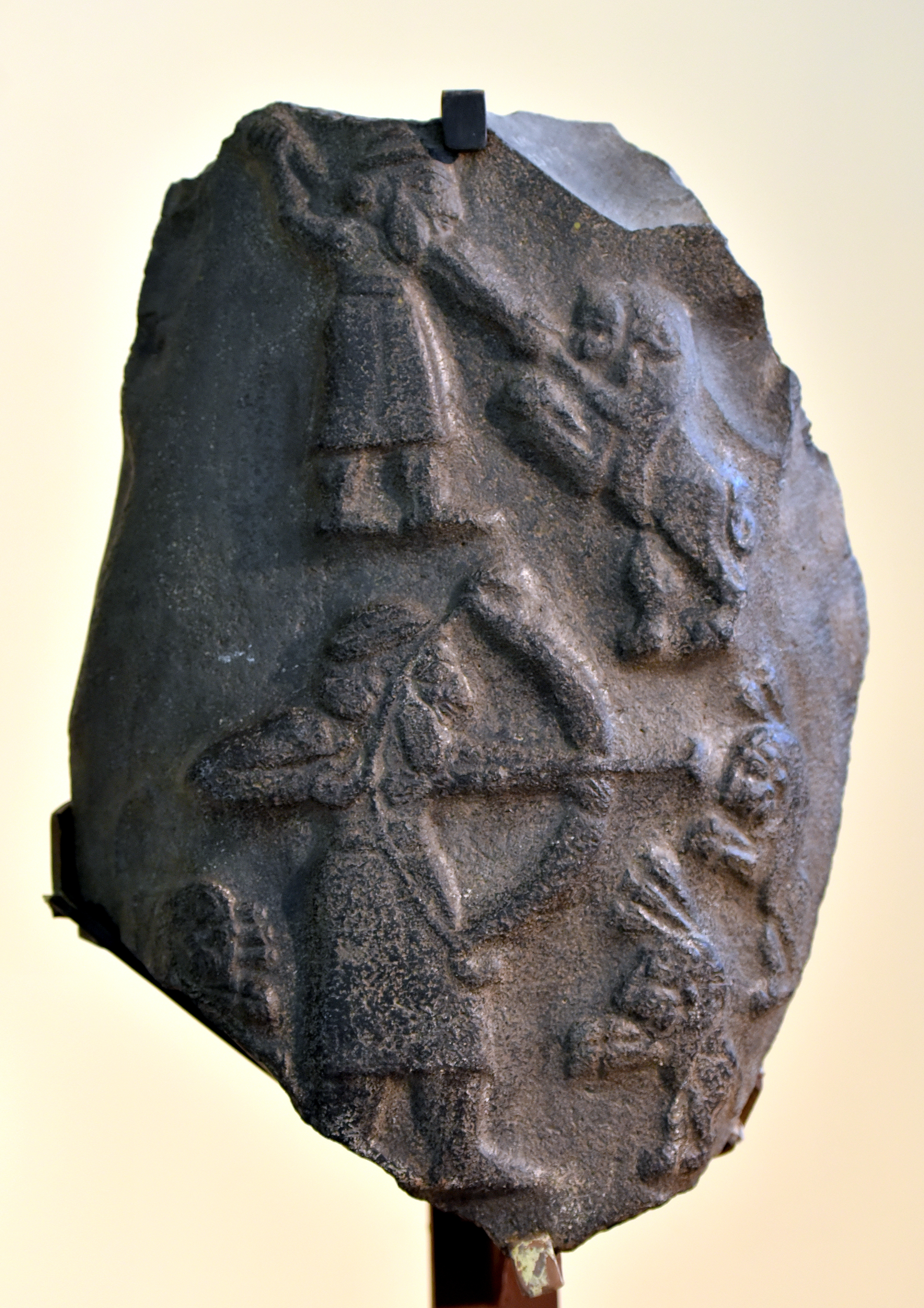
The 'Hunt stele'. National Museum of Iraq.

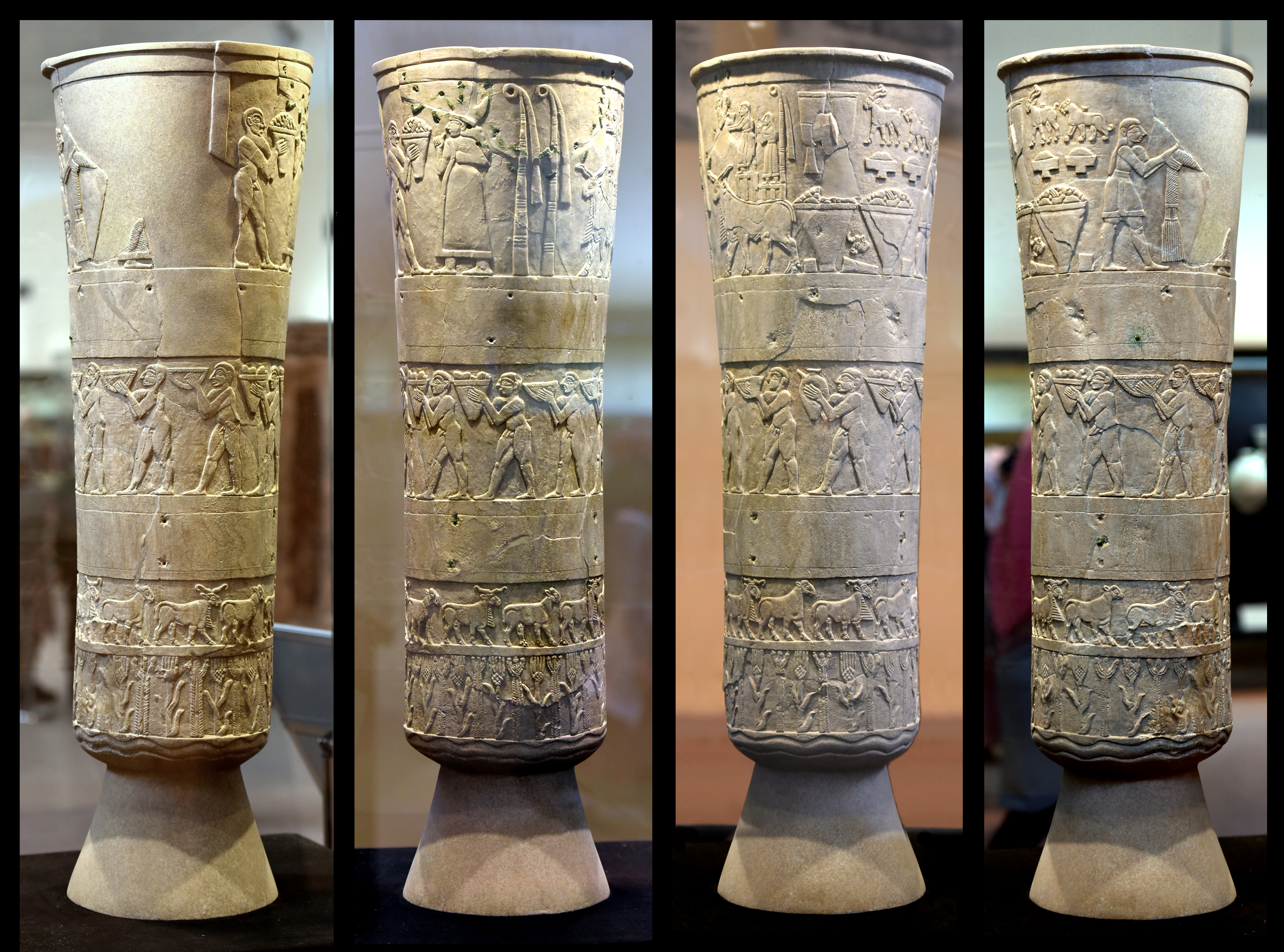
The 'Warka Vase'. National Museum of Iraq.

The glyptic iconography of the Late Uruk period is very innovative, taking advantage of the newly developed cylinder seals to represent more complex scenes than on stamp seals, since they could be rolled out indefinitely, creating a narration with greater dynamism than stamps. The most complex ones depict scenes with animals, mythical beasts, processions, prisoners, and economic activities (animal husbandry, weaving, fishing, etc.). The rich glyptic from Susa features specific motifs such as intertwined snakes and a “Lord of snakes.” Other seals use simpler patterns.

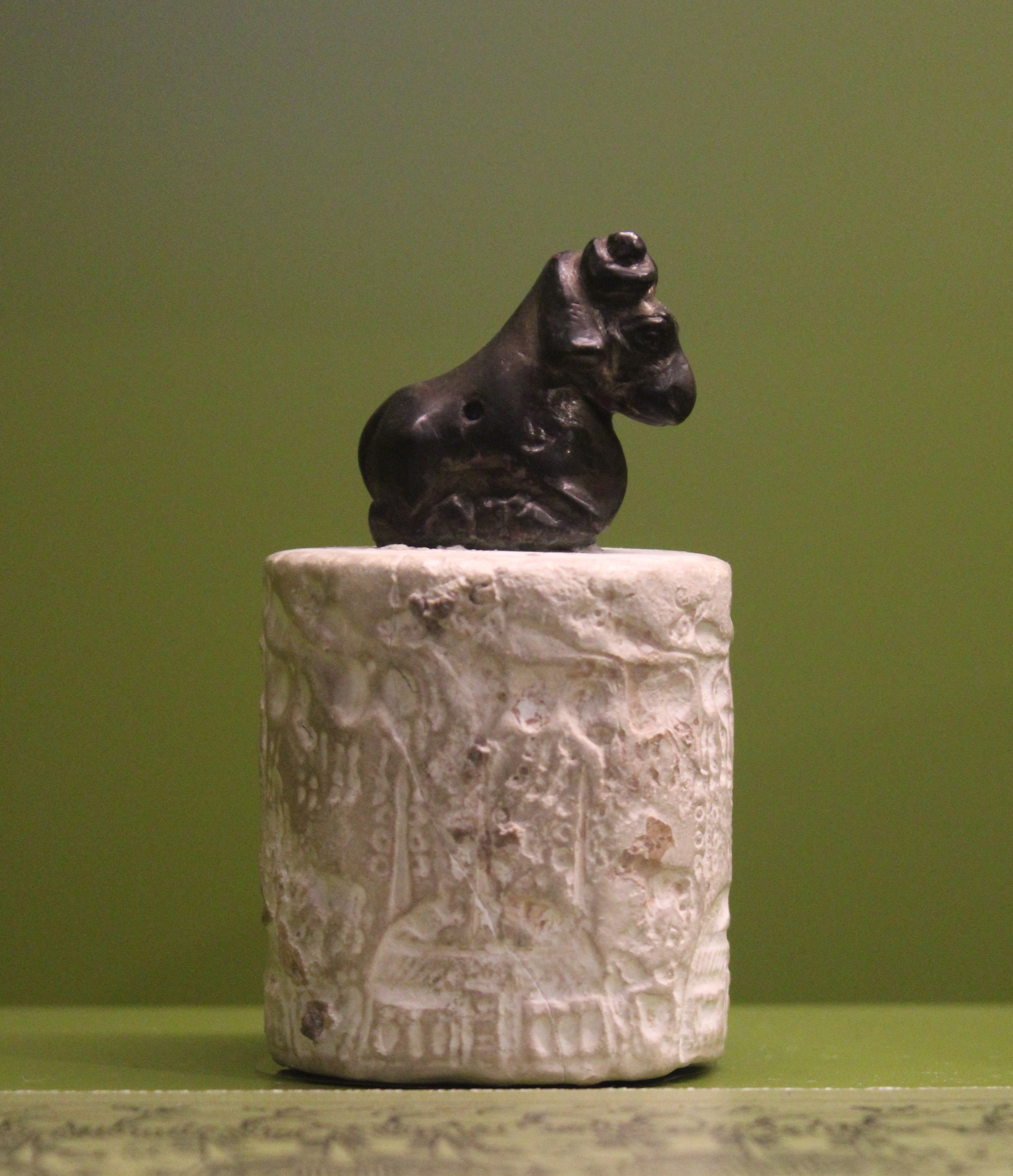
Cylinder seal representing cattle and reed huts, surmounted by a crouching ram in copper alloy. Ashmolean Museum.

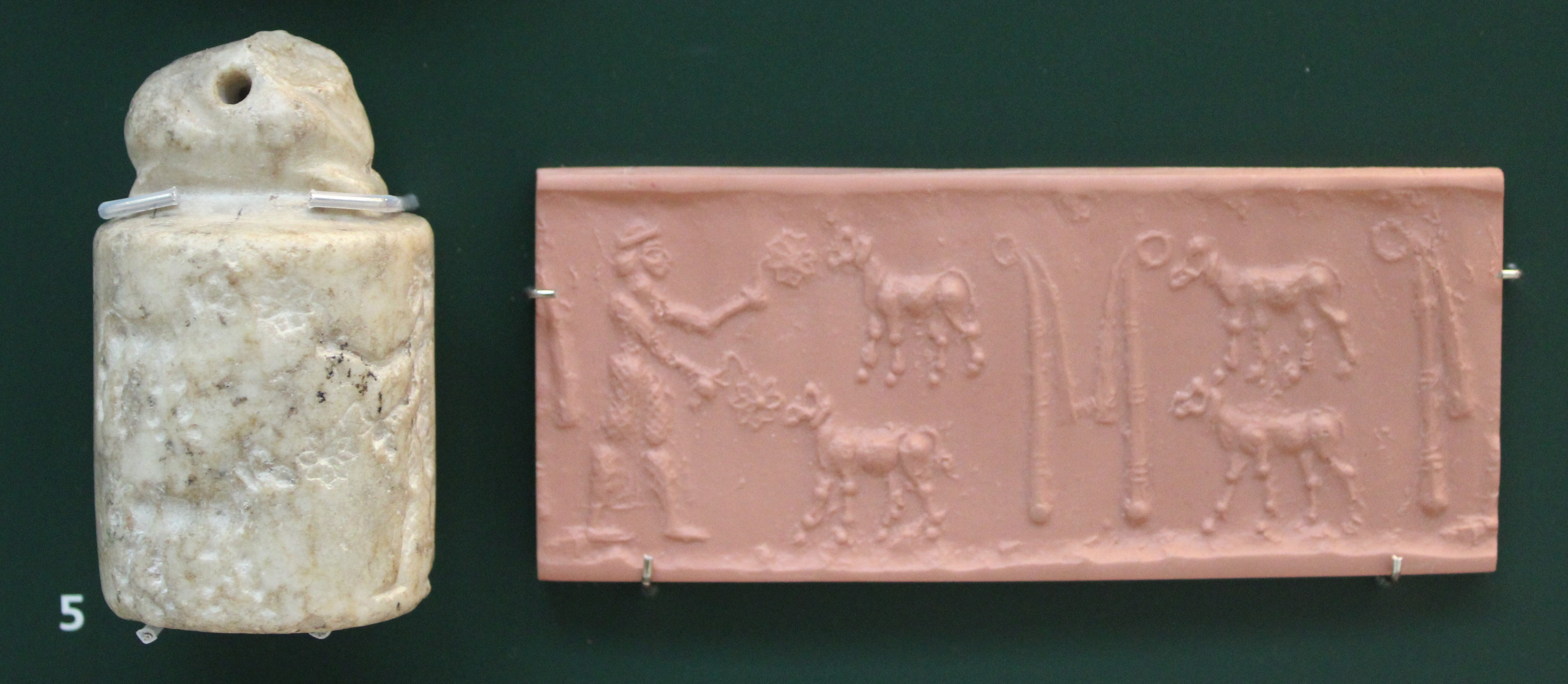
The 'Priest-King' feeding flower to a flock of sheep; standards associated to Inanna. British Museum.

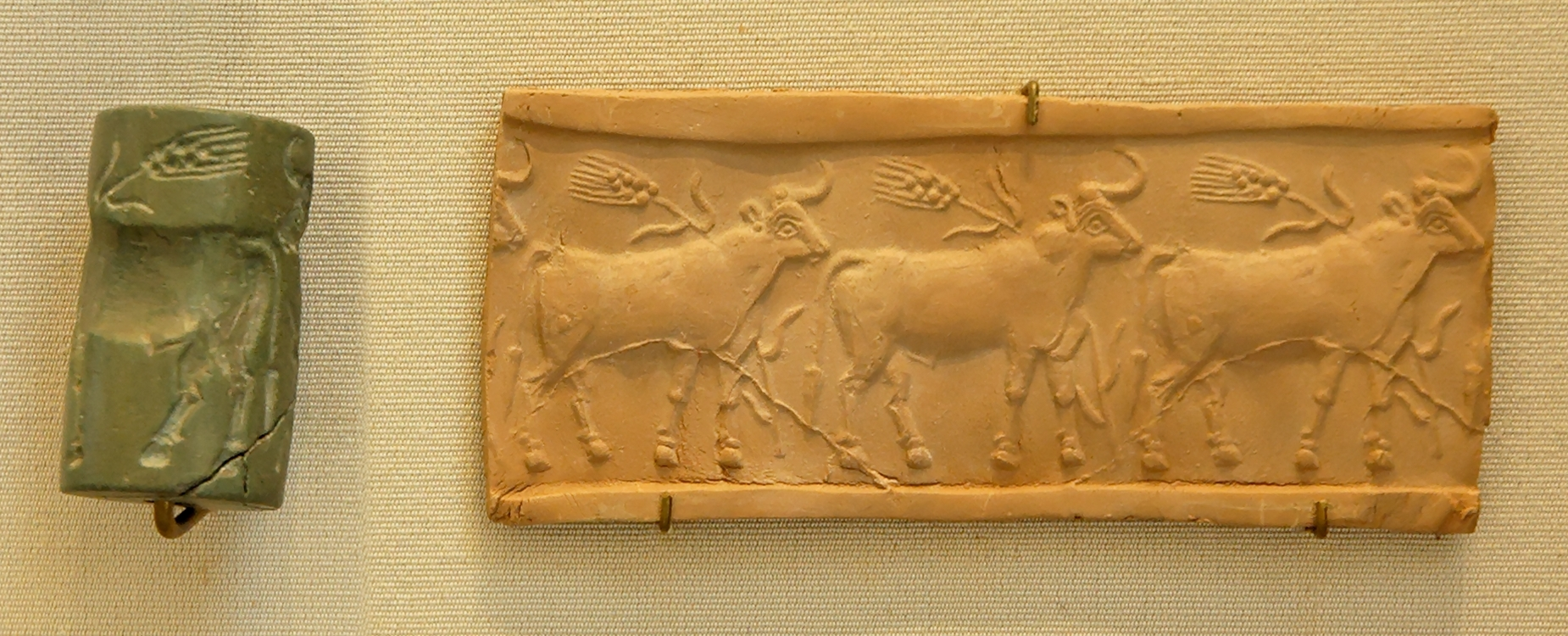
Cattle herd in a wheat field. Louvre Museum.

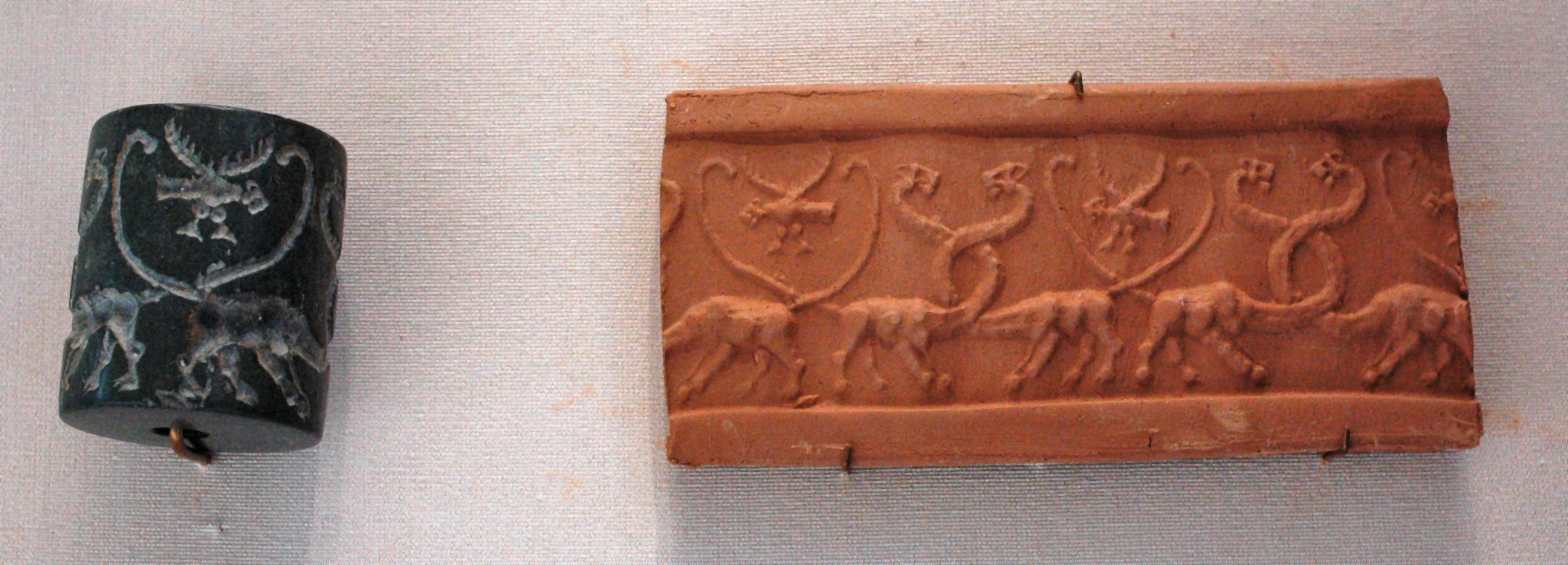
Serpopards (monstrous lions) and lion-headed eagles. Louvre Museum.

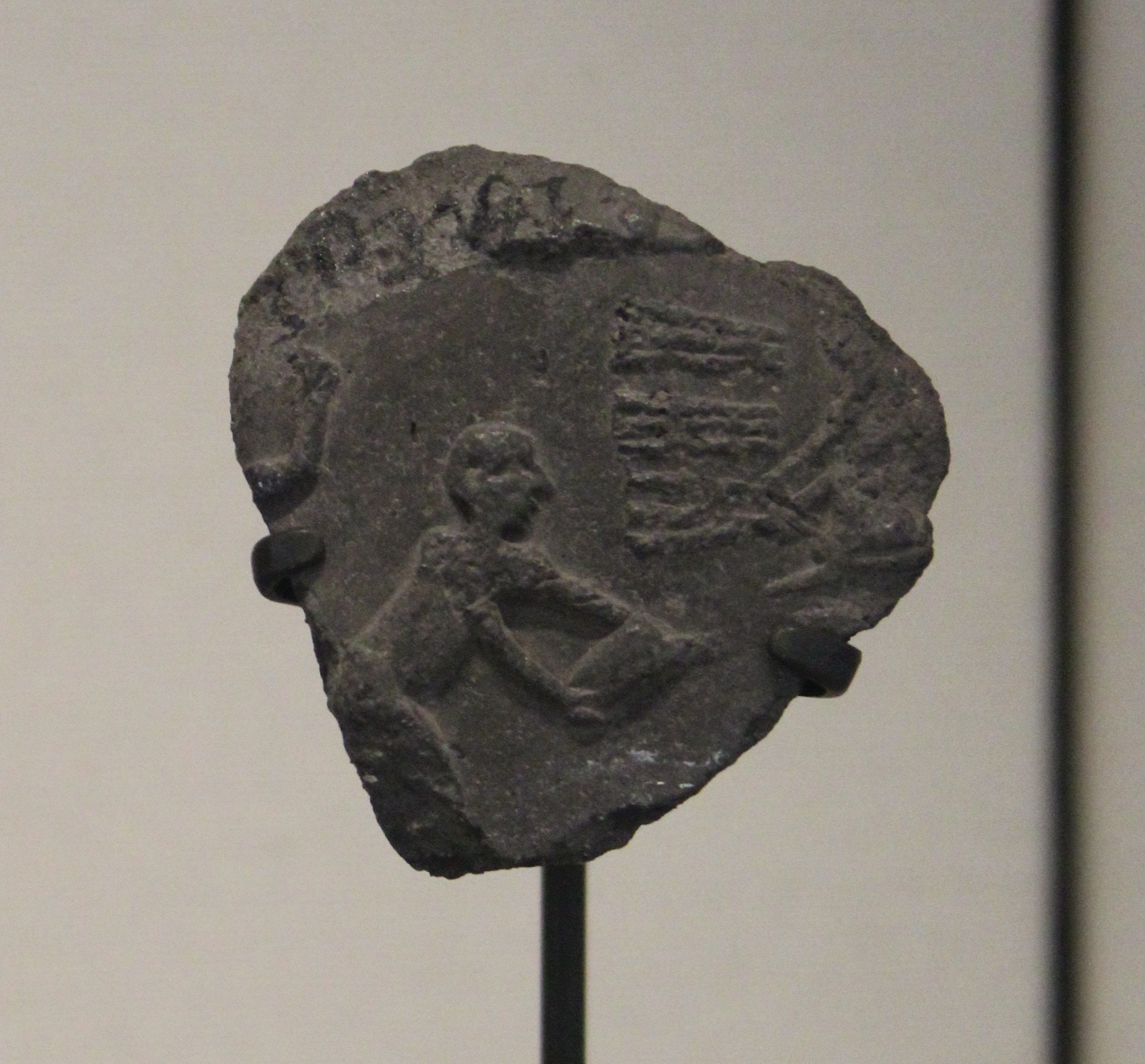
Clay bulla with sealing impression representing a scene of grain storage. From Susa, Louvre Museum.

=== Religion ===
The religion of the Late Uruk period is very difficult to approach, whether in Lower Mesopotamia or in neighboring regions.

Places of worship are difficult to identify by archaeology, particularly in the Eanna area of Uruk. But in several cases, the cult functions of buildings seem probable if we judge by their resemblance to buildings that are certainly sanctuaries from the following periods: the White Temple of Uruk, the temples of Eridu and Tell Uqair. Cultic installations such as altars and basins have been identified there. Temples are also identified at Tell Brak ('Eye Temple'), Arslantepe ('Temple C'), and Susa (High Terrace). It would then appear that the deities were already venerated in temples from this period. The development of sacred spaces used for important ceremonies shows that religion tends to be spatially separated from the secular, an evolution that may be linked to the period's dynamics. Of great interest is the emergence of high terraces supporting cultic buildings (Uruk, Susa), landmarks of the urban landscape.

Documents dating from the Uruk period indicate that deities were already complex figures, conceptualized in human (anthropomorphism), astral, and symbolic forms, including animals. Uruk texts and iconography indicate that the goddess Inanna, the deified planet Venus, was already the city's tutelary deity. She was designated by the proto-cuneiform sign MUŠ_{3} (a buckled reed pole, probably the goddess's standard). Administrative tablets indicate that Inanna received offerings in several aspects, including those personifying the Morning Star and the Evening Star, to which a great festival was dedicated. The Warka Vase is probably a depiction of one of the festivals dedicated to the goddess (depicted on the vase) and of the prosperity granted to humans on the condition that they honor their gods.

The religious beliefs of the 4th millennium BC have been the object of debate: Thorkild Jacobsen saw a religion focused on gods linked to the cycle of nature and fertility. The iconography of various cylinder seals and the Warka Vase uses imagery of abundance, perhaps referring to the cyclical regeneration of nature and sacred marriages.

Then, it is at least possible to discern the main elements of the ideology and religious practices well known from later periods of Mesopotamian history: a divine world organized around a few main figures, represented in human form (anthropomorphism); a cult dominated by urban temples thought of as divine residences, with a cultic calendar including some major festivities, and a cultic personnel (attested in proto-cuneiform lists of officials); an ideology which professes that humans have a duty to honor the gods by providing them with food, drink and other offerings, mobilizing significant resources for this (the temples probably already had important assets such as fields, workshops, animals and slaves).

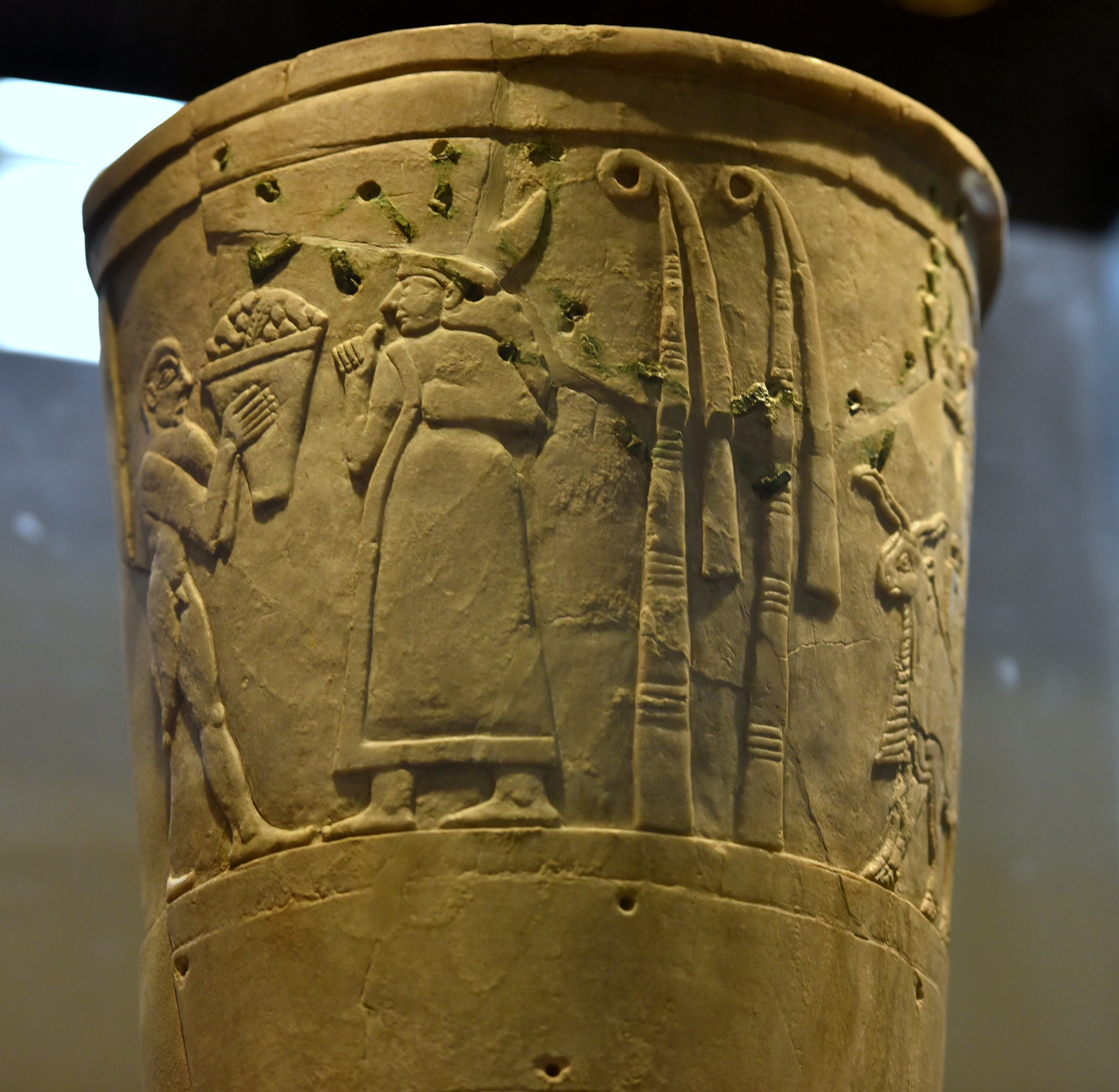
Female figure, generally interpreted as the goddess Inanna (or a priestess?), receiving offerings in front of two reed poles (symbols of the goddess), upper register of the Warka Vase. National Museum of Iraq.

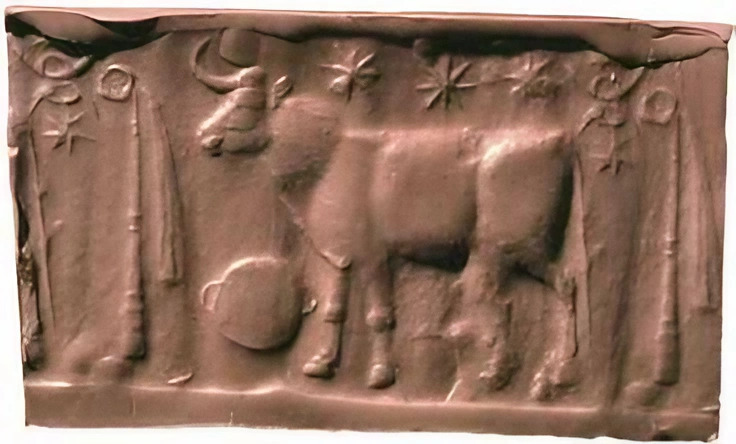
Cylinder seal impression: bull associated with pictographs represented in artistic form: the rising sun (UD), the setting sun (SIG), the religious festival (EZEN) and the emblem of the goddess Inanna (MUŠ_{3}). This sequence can be interpreted as meaning "festival of the morning star and the evening star", i.e., a festival of Inanna, who is identified with the planet Venus. Former Erlenmeyer collection - Berlin.

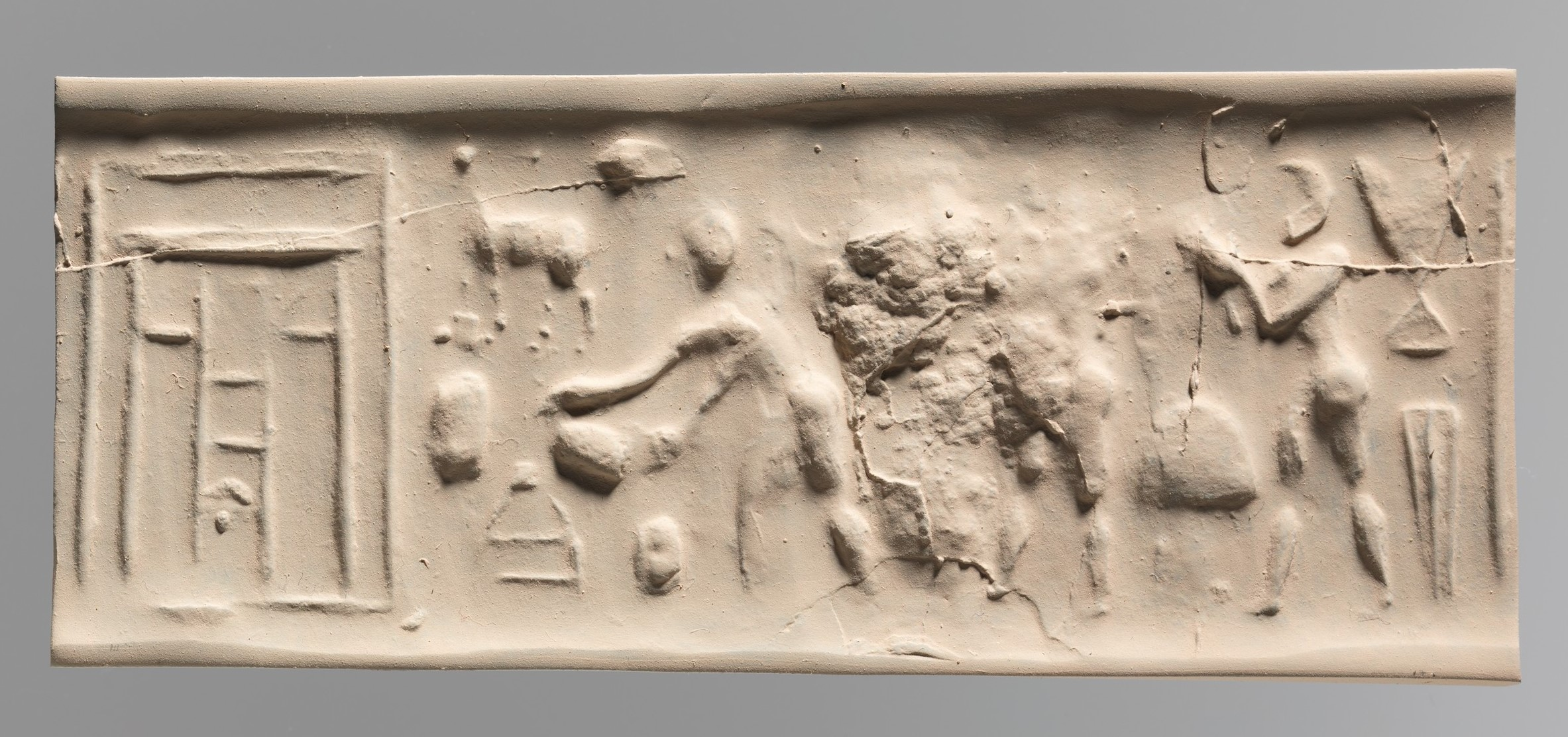
Cylinder seal impression depicting a ritual scene in front of a temple (rectangular construction on the left). Metropolitan Museum of Art.

== Relations with other cultures ==
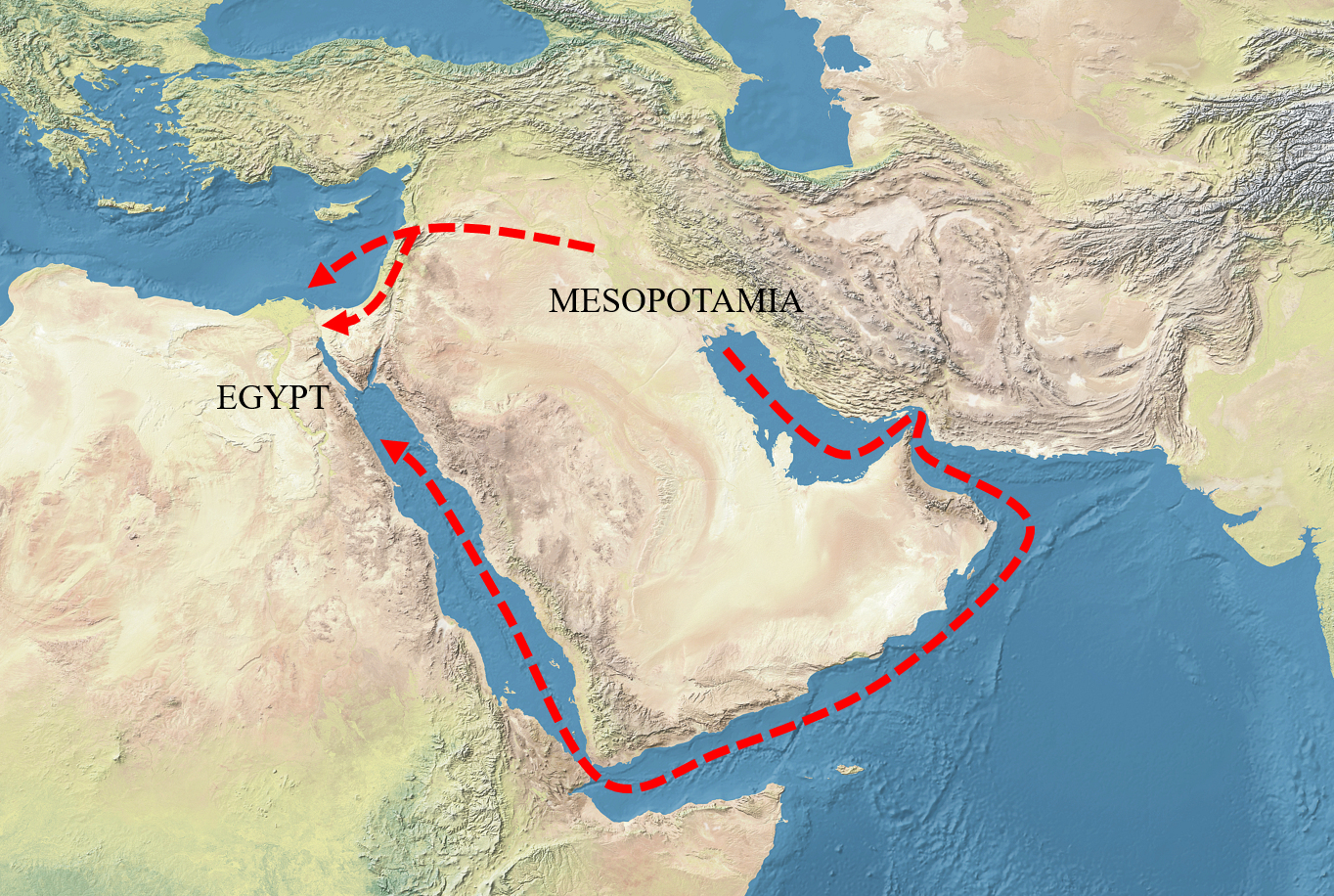
Possible Mesopotamia-Egypt trade routes from the 4th millennium BCE.

The links between Urukean Greater Mesopotamia and the Southern Levant and Egypt are not part of the Uruk expansion, but they shed light on the role of local societies in the reception of Uruk culture.

The first region lacked a stratified society with an embryonic bureaucracy and urbanization, and therefore no strong elites (they are referred to as "chiefdoms"). Thus, there was no local relay for Uruk influence to take root, especially since it was undoubtedly too remote, as this region was much more marked by Egyptian influence during this period.

Egypt-Mesopotamia relations seem to have developed from the 4th millennium BCE, starting in the Uruk period for Mesopotamia and in the pre-literate Gerzean culture for Prehistoric Egypt (circa 3500-3200 BCE). Influences can be seen in the visual arts of Egypt, in imported products, and also in the possible transfer of writing from Mesopotamia to Egypt, and generated "deep-seated" parallels in the early stages of both cultures. But overall, Urukean influence seems limited to objects and images perceived as prestigious and exotic (Gebel el-Arak Knife), chosen by local elites at a time when they needed markers to assert their power in a state society also under construction.

Uruk King-Priest

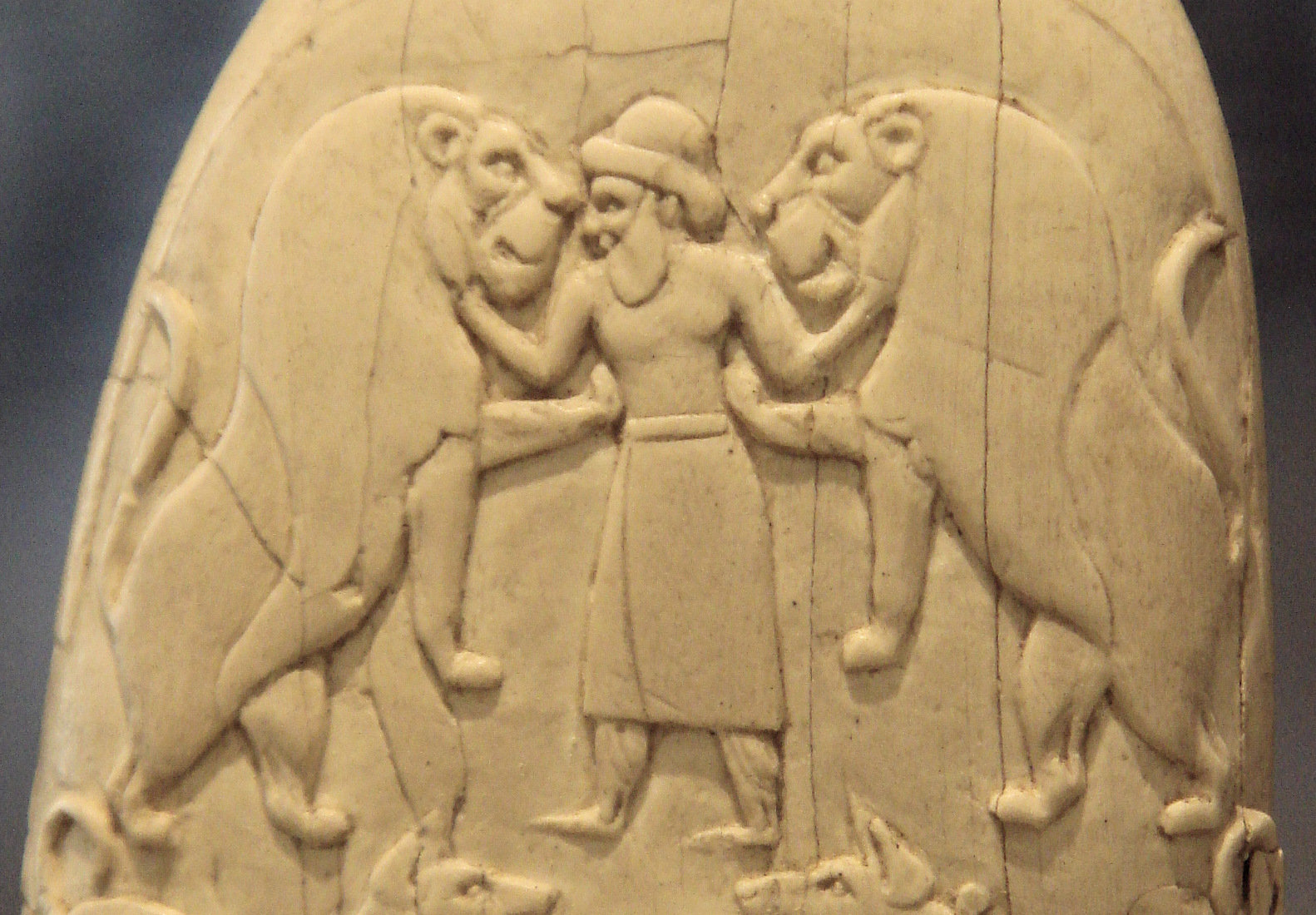
Mesopotamian king as Master of Animals on the Gebel el-Arak Knife, dated Naqada II circa 3300-3200 BC, Abydos, Egypt. This work of art suggests early Egypt-Mesopotamia relations, showing the influence of Mesopotamia on Egypt at an early date, and the state of Mesopotamian royal iconography during the Uruk period. Louvre Museum.

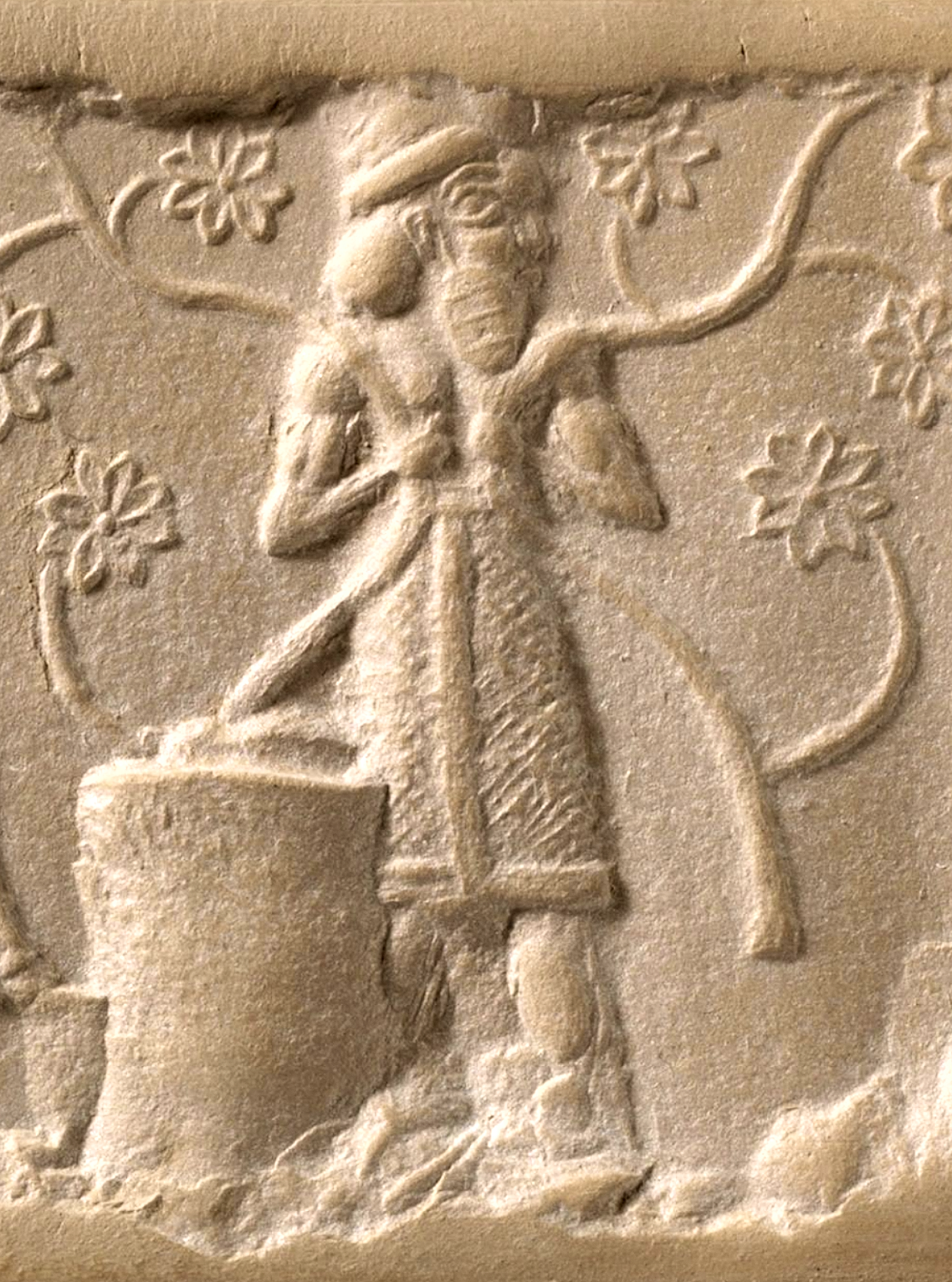
Similar portrait of an Uruk King-Priest with a brimmed round hat and large beard, bare-chested with a straight skirt. Uruk, 3300-3000 BC.

Contacts have also been detected between the Urukean sphere and the regions of eastern Arabia, which pass through the Persian Gulf. They have been highlighted by the discovery of objects of Mesopotamian manufacture in Abu Dhabi and Oman, as well as the presence of the name Dilmun, which designates the island of Bahrain and the neighbouring mainland, in proto-cuneiform tablets from Uruk. Some metallic objects found in Mesopotamia for the end of the 4th millennium were made with copper imported from Oman. Mesopotamian ceramics from the Jemdet Nasr period are attested on several sites in these regions, attesting to a development of relations.

== Uruk culture sites ==
Notable sites based on presence of proto-cuneiform tablets, beveled rim bowls, or confirmed Uruk monumental structures:

- Modern Iraq: in southern Iraq Uruk (Eanna, Kullaba), Kish, Umma, Girsu, Jemdet Nasr, Eridu, Tell al-Hayyad, Abu Salabikh, Tell Uqair, Larsa, Khafajah, in northern Iraq Tell al-Hawa, Shakhi Kora, Tell Rubeidheh, Grai Resh, Kani Shaie, Girdi Qala and Logardan, Gasur, and Nineveh.
- Modern Iran: in the Zagros Mountains, Godin Tepe, Tall-e Malyan, and Chogha Gavaneh, in northern Iran Tepe Özbeki, Tepe Sialk, Tepe Sofalin, and Tepe Ghabristan, in central Iran Susa, Tepe Yahya, Chogha Mish, Abu Fanduweh, Tepe Farukhabad, and Tepe Musiyan, and in southern Iran Tol-e Nuraba, Tal-i-Iblis, and Mahtoutabad.
- Modern Syria: Tell Humeida, Tell Sheikh Hassan, Hacınebi Tepe, Jebel Aruda, Habuba Kabira, Hamoukar, Tell er-Ramadi, Tell Brak, and Tell Qraya.
- Modern Turkey: Arslantepe, Başur Höyük, Tilbeş Höyük, Tepecik, and Hassek Höyük.

== See also ==
- History of Mesopotamia
- History of Sumer

== Bibliography ==
=== Ancient Near East, Mesopotamia ===
- Benoit, Agnès (2003). Art et archéologie : les civilisations du Proche-Orient ancien. Manuels de l'école du Louvre (in French). Paris: RMN.
- Charvát, Petr (2002). Mesopotamia Before History. London & New York: Routledge.
- Crawford, Harriet E. W. (2004). Sumer and the Sumerians (2nd ed.). Cambridge University Press. ISBN 9780521533386.
- Forest, Jean-Daniel (1996). Mésopotamie: L'apparition de l'État, VII^{e}-III^{e} millénaires (in French). Paris: Paris-Méditerranée.
- Frangipane, Marcella (2023). Un frammento alla volta: Dieci lezioni dall'archeologia (in Italian). Bologna: Il Mulino.
- Huot, Jean-Louis (2004). Une archéologie des peuples du Proche-Orient: vol. I, Des peuples villageois aux cités-États (X^{e}-III^{e} millénaire av. J.-C.) (in French). Paris: Errances.
- Joannès, Francis (2001). Dictionnaire de la civilisation mésopotamienne. Bouquins (in French). Paris: Robert Laffont.
- Nissen, Hans-Jörg (1988). The Early History of the Ancient Near East. Chicago: University of Chicago Press.

=== Uruk period ===
- Algaze, Guillermo (2008). Ancient Mesopotamia at the Dawn of Civilization: The Evolution of an Urban Landscape. Chicago: University of Chicago Press.
- Algaze, Guillermo (1993). The Uruk world system: the dynamics of expansion of early Mesopotamian civilisation. Chicago; London: The University of Chicago Press.
- Algaze, Guillermo (2013). "The End of Prehistory and The Uruk Period". In Crawford, Harriet (ed.). The Sumerian World. Routledge. pp. 68–94. ISBN 978-1-136-21912-2.
- Butterlin, Pascal (2003). Les temps proto-urbains de Mésopotamie: Contacts et acculturation à l'époque d'Uruk au Moyen-Orient (in French). Paris: CNRS Éditions.
- Butterlin, Pascal (2015). "Uruk-kultur (culture urukéenne)". Reallexikon der Assyriologie und Vorderasiatischen Archäologie (in French). Vol. XIV. pp. 487–494.
- Crüsemann, Nicola; van Ess, Margarete; Salje, Beate; Hilgert, Markus, eds. (2019). "A Metropolis circa 3000 BC". Uruk: First City of the Ancient World. Los Angeles: J. Paul Getty Museum. pp. 87–195.
- Englund, Robert K. (1998). "Texts from the Late Uruk Period". In Bauer, Joseph; Englund, Robert K.; Krebernik, Manfred (eds.). Mesopotamien: Späturuk-Zeit und Frühdynastische Zeit. Orbis Biblicus et Orientalis. Fribourg et Göttingen: Universitätsverlag Freiburg Schweiz and Vandenhoeck and Ruprecht. pp. 15–233. ENG.
- Glassner, Jean-Jacques (2000). Écrire à Sumer: L'invention du cunéiforme. L'Univers historique (in French). Paris: Éditions du Seuil. GLA.
- Lafont, Bertrand (2017). "Uruk et la révolution urbaine (3500-2900)". Mésopotamie : De Gilgamesh à Artaban (3300-120 av. J.-C.) (in French). Paris: Belin. pp. 49–103.
- Liverani, Mario (2006). Uruk: The First City. Translated by Zainab Bahrani; Marc Van de Mieroop. London: Equinox.
- Selz, Gebhard J. (2020). "The Uruk Phenomenon". In Karen Radner, Nadine Moeller and Daniel T. Potts (ed.). The Oxford History of the Ancient Near East, Volume 1: From the Beginnings to Old Kingdom Egypt and the Dynasty of Akkad. New York: Oxford University Press. pp. 163–244.
