= Habuba Kabira =

Archaeological site in Syria

- Location within Syria
- 36.151446°N 38.061950°E
- Periods: Late Chalcolithic, Early and Middle Bronze Ages
- Location: Syria
- Region: Aleppo Governorate

Site notes
- Excavation dates: 1969–1975
- Archaeologists: Ernst Heinrich, Eva Strommenger, André Finet

Habuba Kabira (al-Ḥabbūbah al-Qabīrah, also Hubaba Kabire and Habuba Kebira) is a Bronze Age archaeological site in modern Syria founded during the Uruk period in the late 4th millennium BC. It is on the west bank of the Euphrates River in Aleppo Governorate. The site was excavated as part of a rescue archaeology effort preceding the construction of the Tabqa Dam; it is now mostly underwater.

Habuba Kabira was about 1,300 km (810 mi) from the southern Mesopotamian city of Uruk, 5 km (3.1 mi) north of Tell Halawa, 10 km (6.2 mi) south of Mumbaqat, and 8 km (5.0 mi) upstream from Jebel Aruda.

The Habuba Kabira complex consists of two sites;

- Habuba Kabira South (also Habuba Kabira Süd), a protoliterate flat site Lower Town with the adjacent acropolis of Tell Qanas (Tall Qannāṣ, also Tell Kannas), the Upper Town. It was founded in the Late Uruk period and was occupied for around 120 years before being abandoned.
- Habuba Kabira North, a high mound which was founded in the Uruk period and then occupied through the following Early Bronze and Middle Bronze Ages before being abandoned.

Habuba Kabira North and Tell Kannas showed indications of some earlier use in the form of protoliterate clay tokens dating to the 7th through 4th millennium BC.

== History ==
Habuba Kabira as a whole was in use through the Late Chacolithic period into the Middle Bronze period. Habuba Kabira South and its acropolis Tell Kannas were built in the later part of the 4th millennium BC as part of the Uruk Expansion and abandoned after about 120 years. Occupation at Habuba Kabira North began in the Uruk period and continued in the Middle Bronze age.

There were also several other late Uruk enclaves and outposts in this general area. They include Arslantepe (attested at level VIA), Jebel Aruda (8 km (5.0 mi) north near Tell es-Sweyhat), Tell Sheikh Hassan, Hacınebi Tepe, and Tepecik (Elazığ Province, attested at level 3). Godin Tepe is a similar site in Iran.

== Archaeology ==
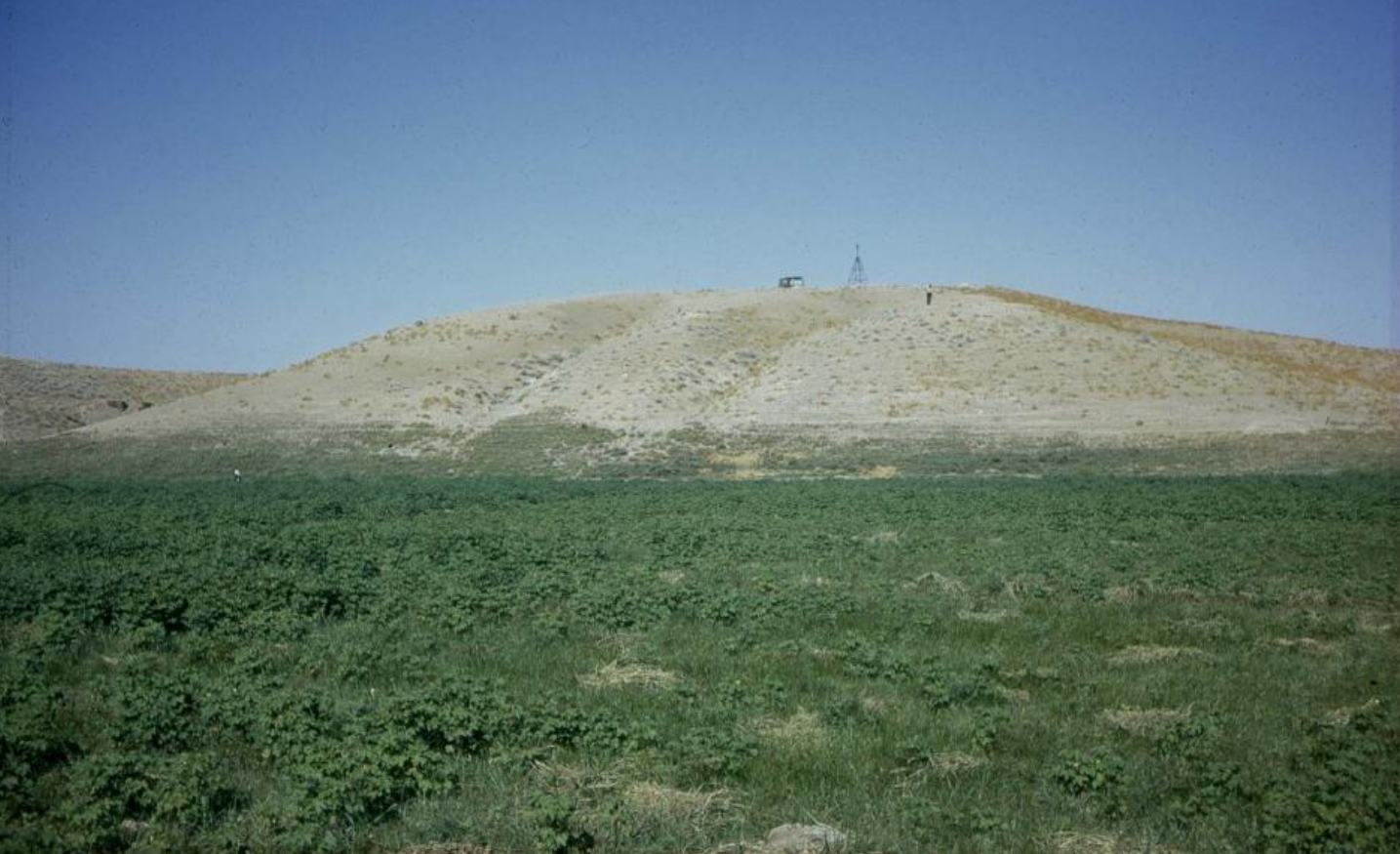
Habuba Kabira Süd before the area was flooded by the Tabqa Dam project

The low site of Hubaba Kubira South covers an area of about 18 hectares with the area encompassed by the city wall being about 10 hectares. The mound of Tell Qanas is adjacent. Hubaba Kubira North is about 230 meters in diameter and rises to about 14 meters above the plain. The east and north slopes of the mound are steep while the west and south have gentle slopes. It was first recorded by during surveys in 1963 and 1964 by Abdel Kader Rihaoui and Maurits N. van Loon.

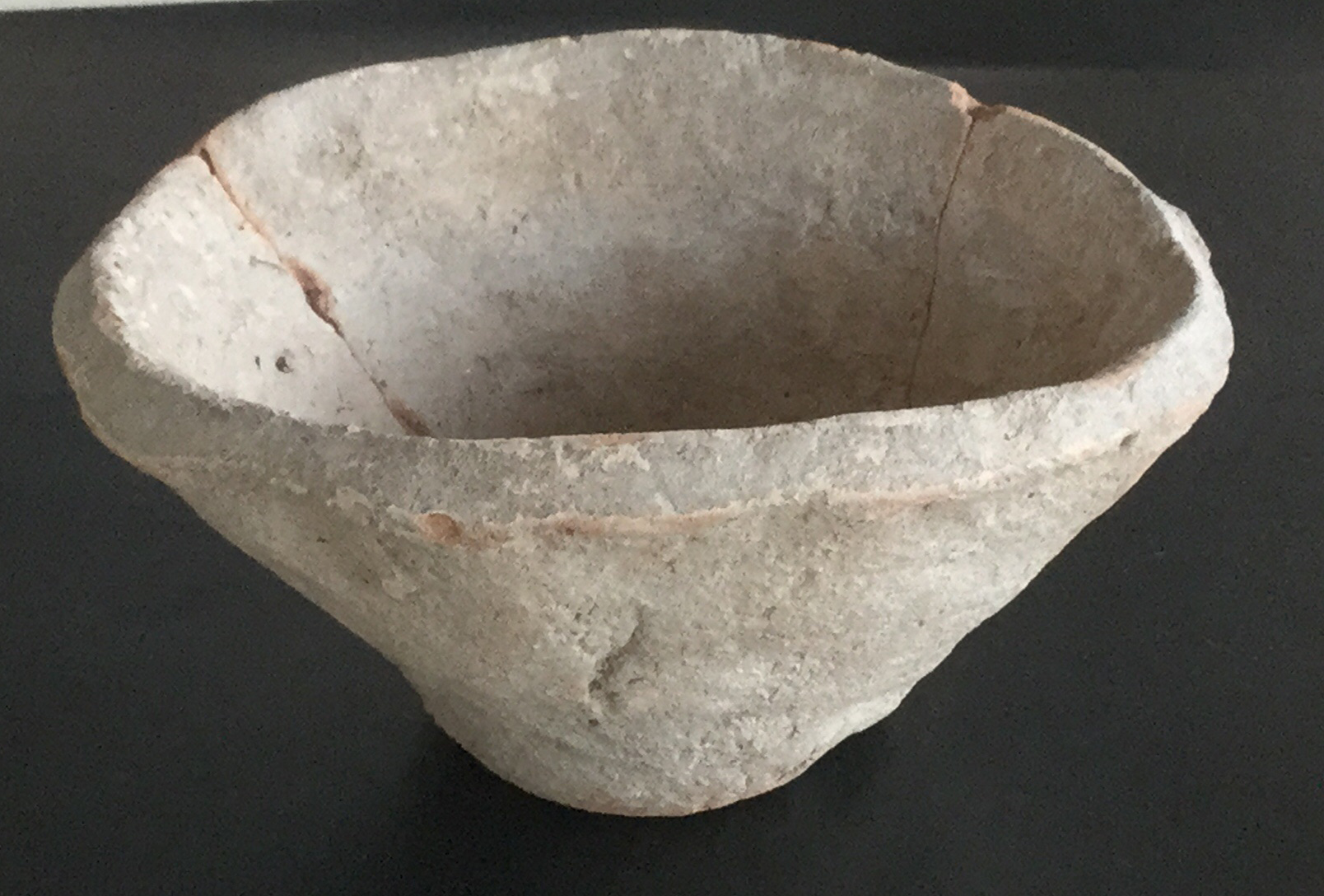
Uruk-period beveled rim bowl, ca. 3400–3200 BCE, from Habuba Kabira in Syria

The Hubaba Kubira was excavated for 9 seasons from 1969 to 1975 by a Deutsche Orient-Gesellschaft team led by Ernst Heinrich and Eva Strommenger. Hubaba Kubira South was found to be a planned settlement with a three meter wide mudbrick town wall with regular towers and two gates. The town was laid out around a north-south axis with paved streets and drainage systems. The western portion of the wall was 600 meters long and a small outer wall was added late in the occupation. A walled area in the center held cultic and administrative buildings. South of the town wall there was an irrigated agricultural area. The site had at least three occupation layers, dated to the Late Chacolithic (LC 4-5) and covering about 120 years, corresponding to the Uruk V and IV periods. The first occupation, founded on virgin soil, was about 6 hectares in extent. In the next phases it grew to its final extent which, including extramural habitation north and south of the wall, covered 22 hectares.

Only the southeastern portion of Hubaba Kubira North was excavated as the rest of the mound was covered with a modern cemetery. An Early Bronze IV pottery kiln was found at Habuba Kabira North. Excavation found 20 occupation levels with levels 17-20 being dated to Middle Bronze IIA period. Small finds included clay tokens. Three Uruk V period (c. 3500-3350 BC) clay tablets, called "numerical tablets" or "impressed tablets", were found at the site.

Tell Qanas, the citadel area of Habuba Kubira South, was excavated beginning in 1967 by a Belgian team led by André Finet. It was occupied from roughly 3700 BC to 3100 BC. Several large buildings were found including the tripartite plan North Temple and South Temple interior niches and basins and a large administrative building with attached magazine containing numerous storage jars. Many jar stoppers sealed with cylinder seals were found. About 58 protoliterate clay tokens were found at the site.

As at Jebel Aruda and similar middle and late Uruk period sites, despite extensive excavation no Uruk period burials were found. One intrusive Early Bronze 1 tomb was found.

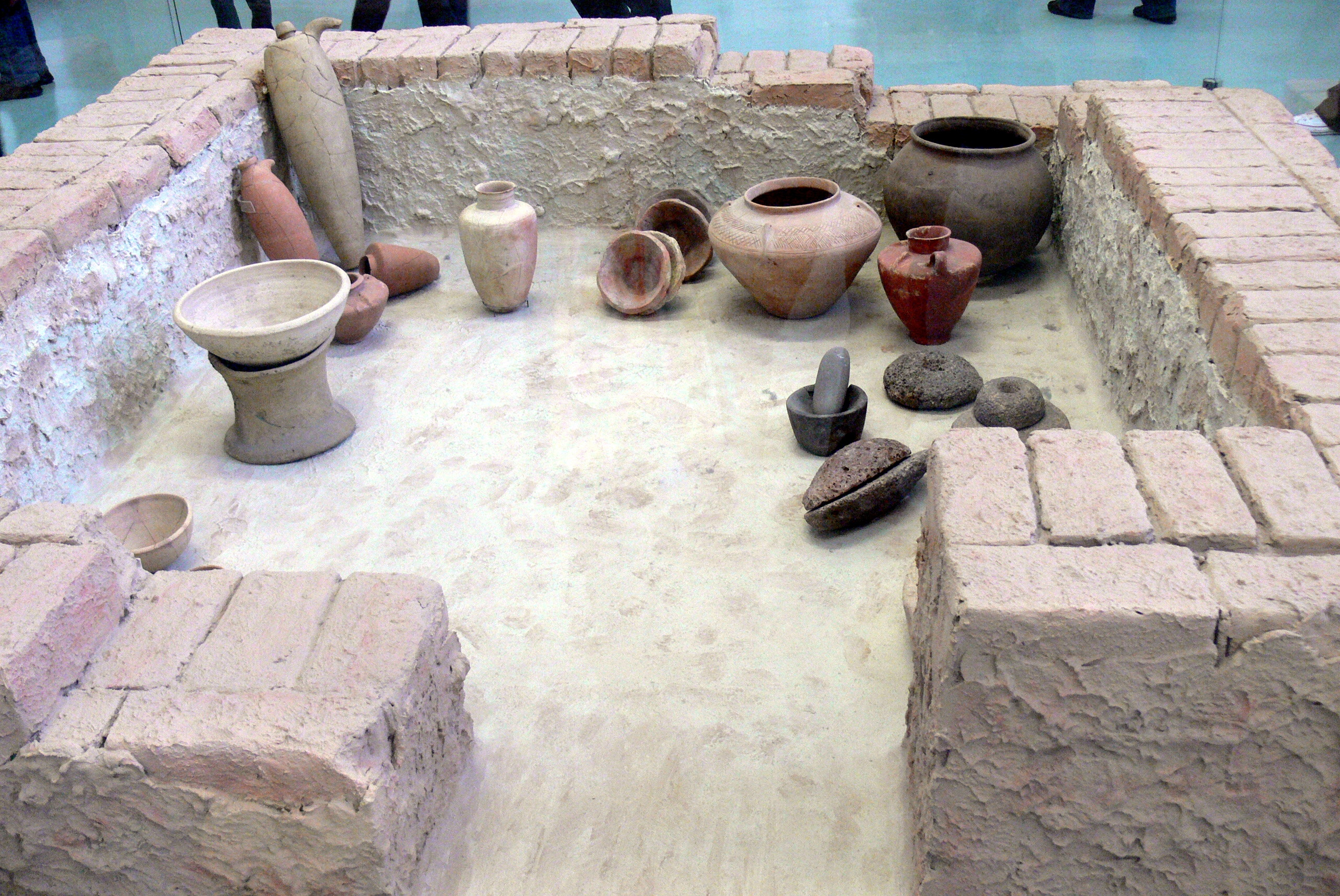
Kabira reconstruction, Berlin Museum

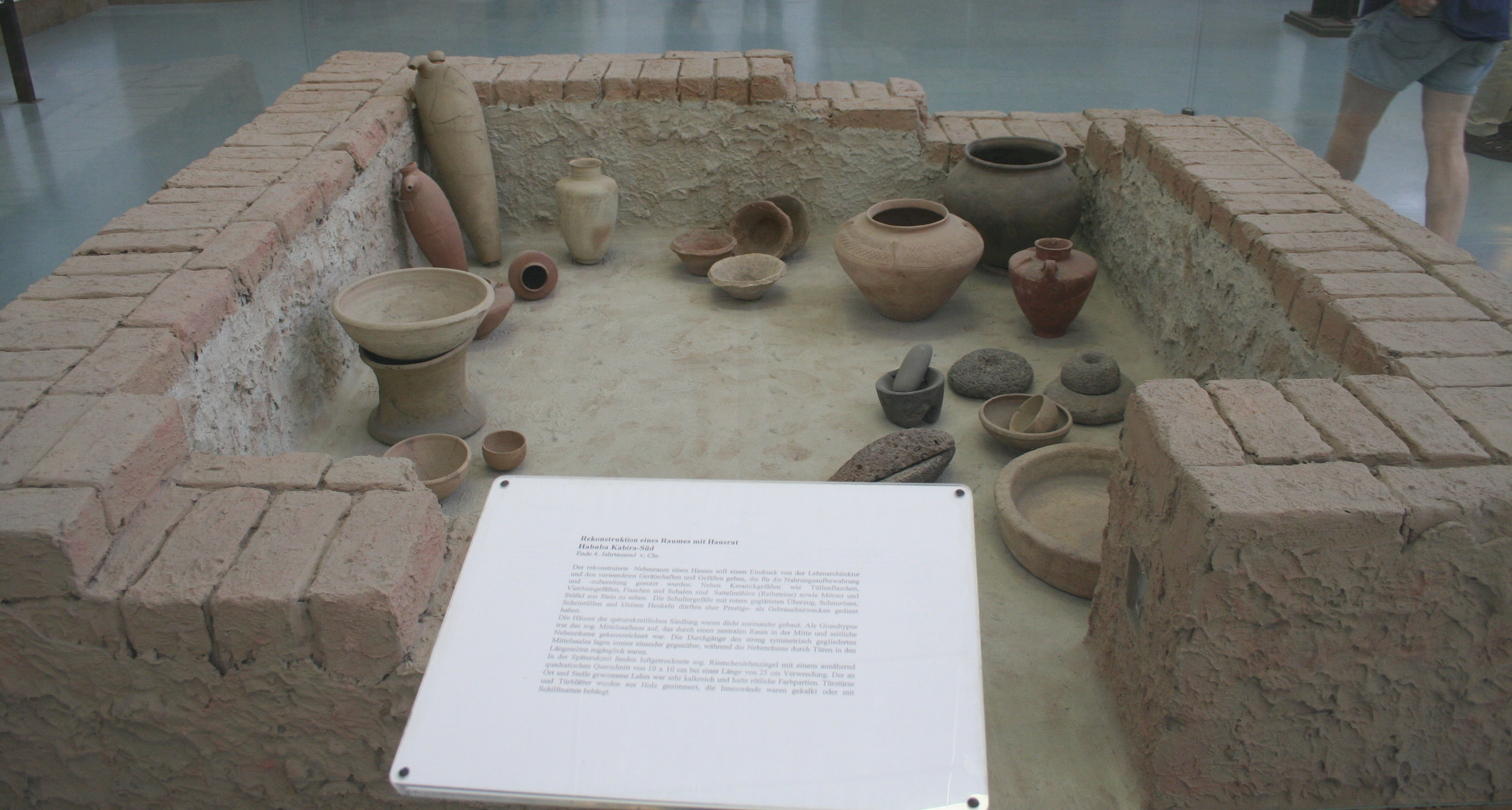
Berlin Museum

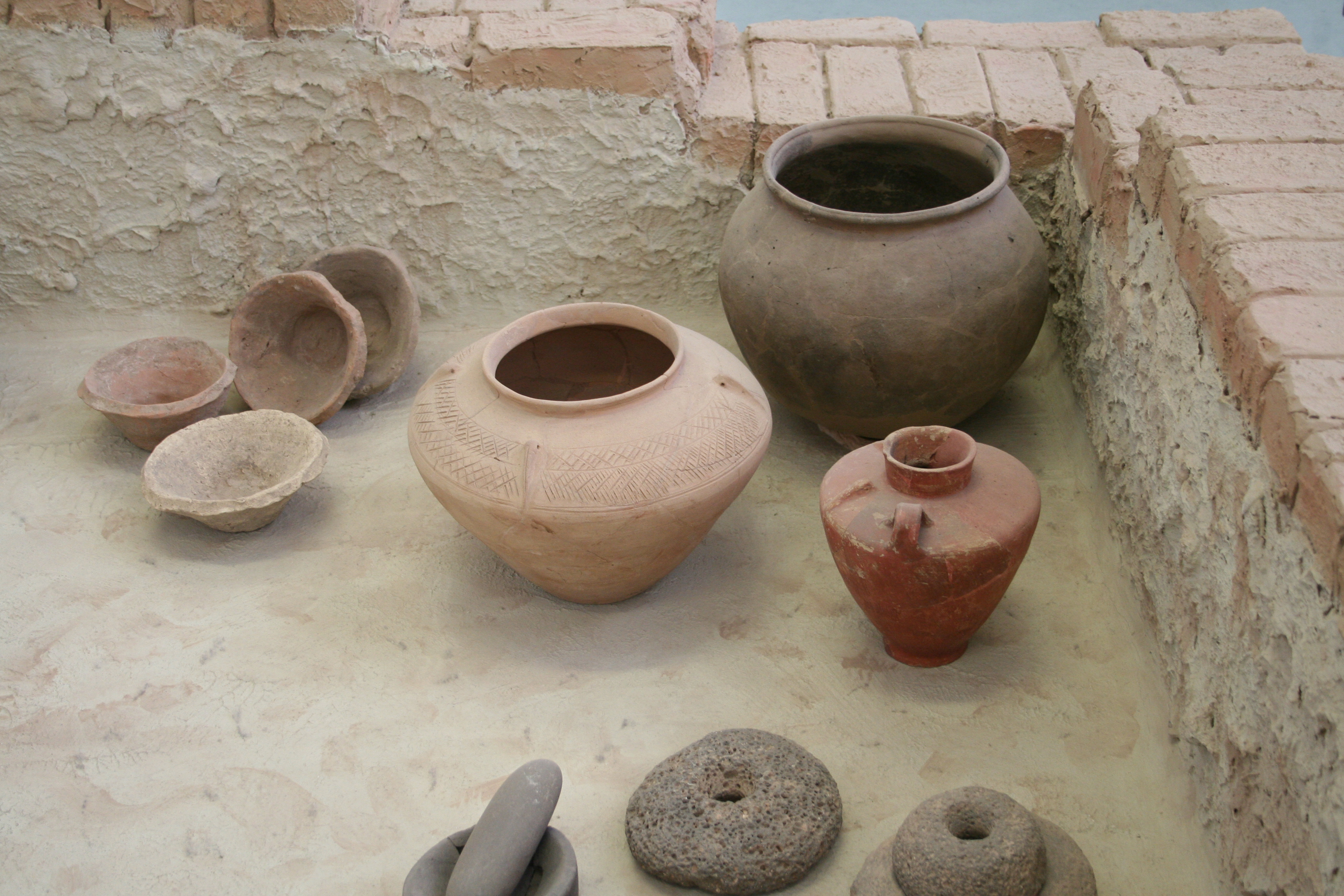
Berlin Museum

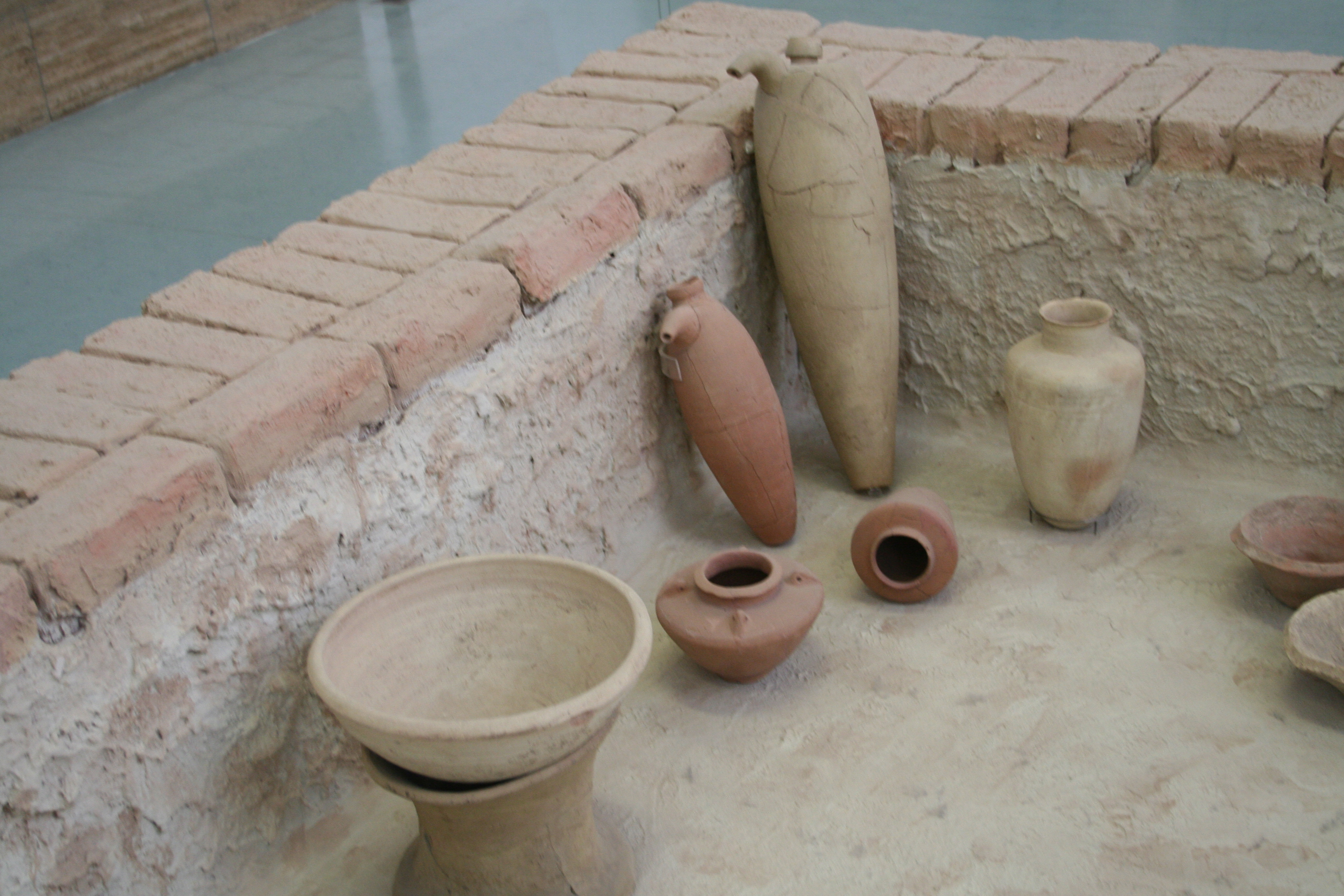
Berlin Museum

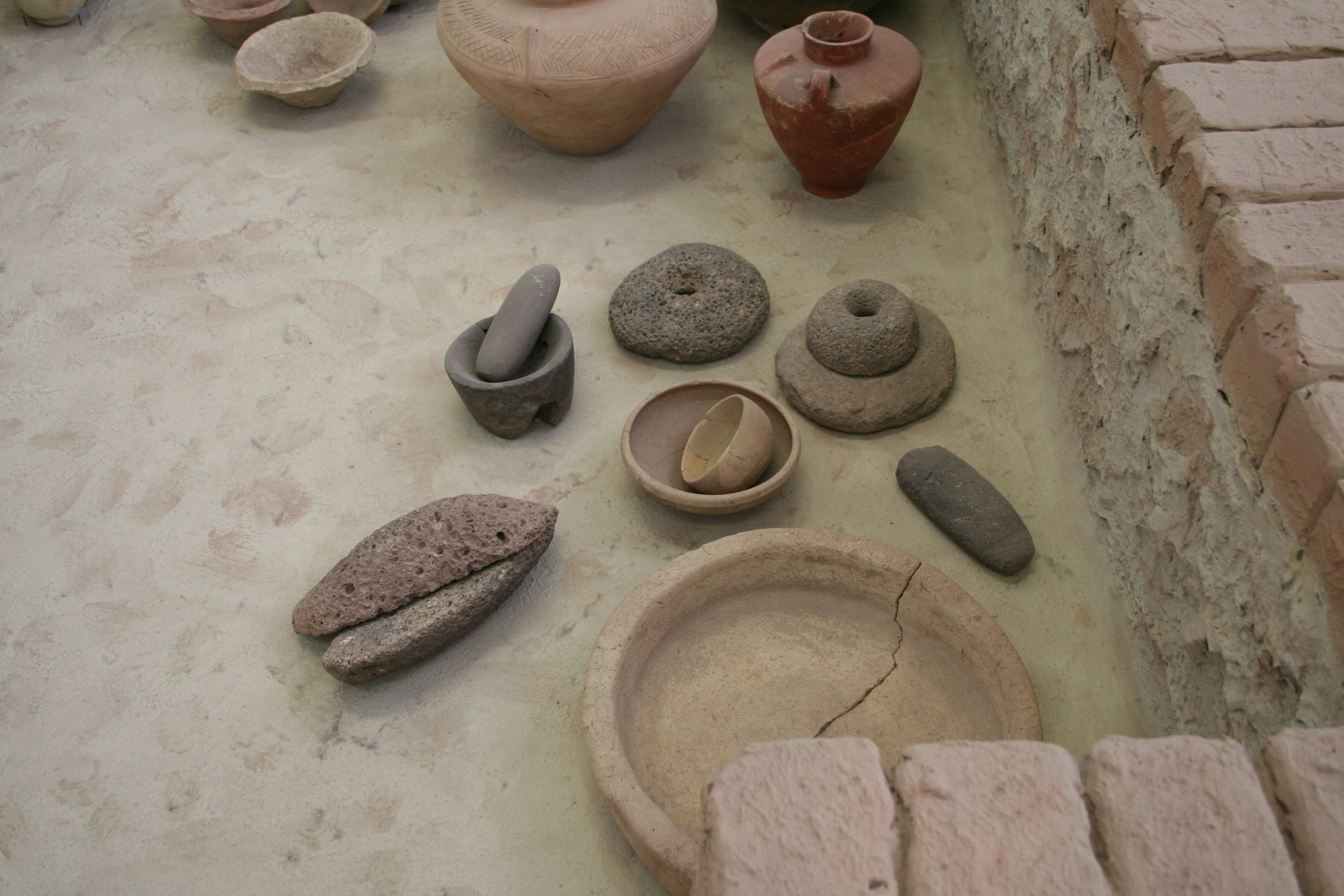
Berlin Museum

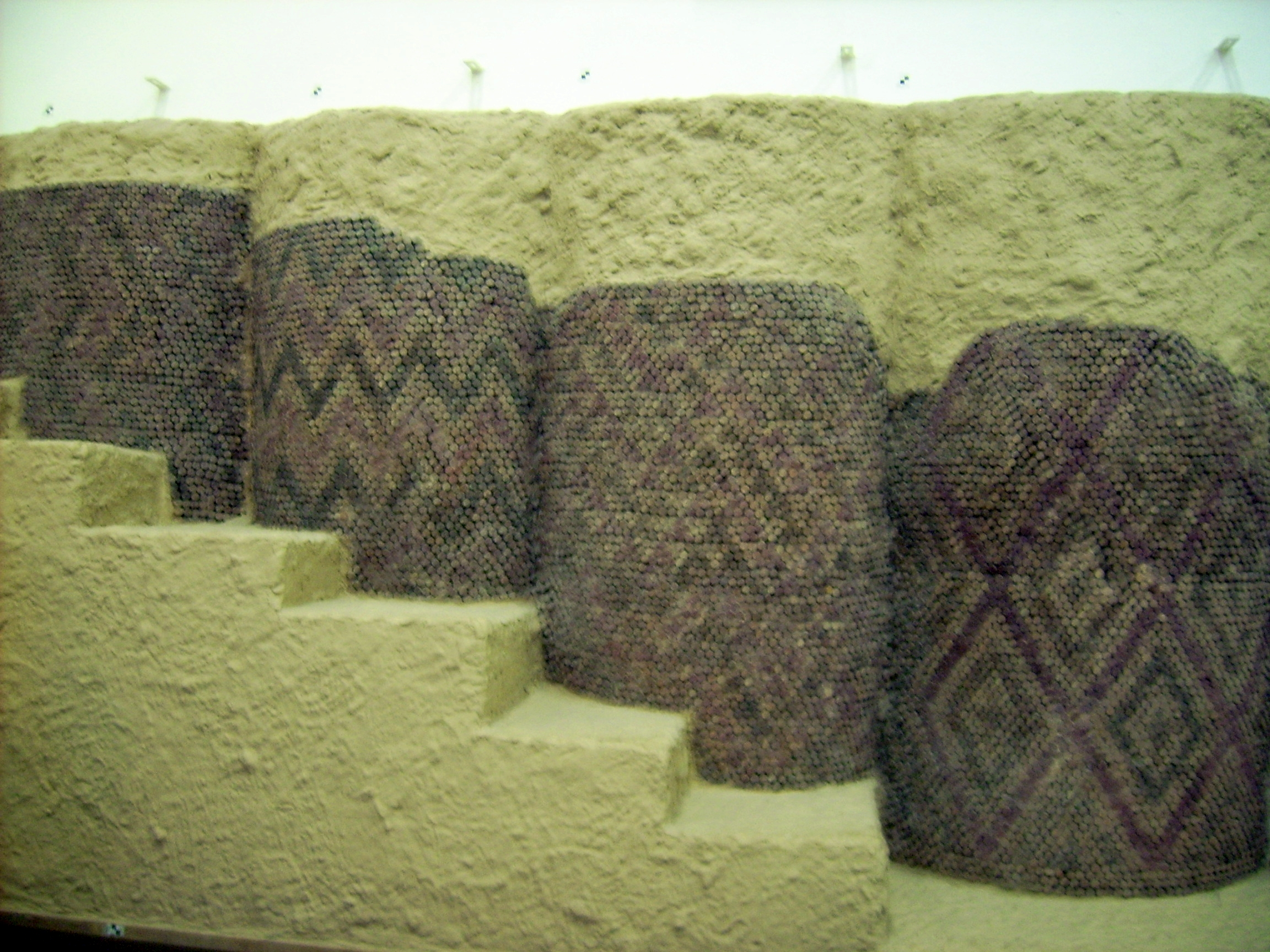
Stone cone mosaic from Habuba Kabira (reconstruction)

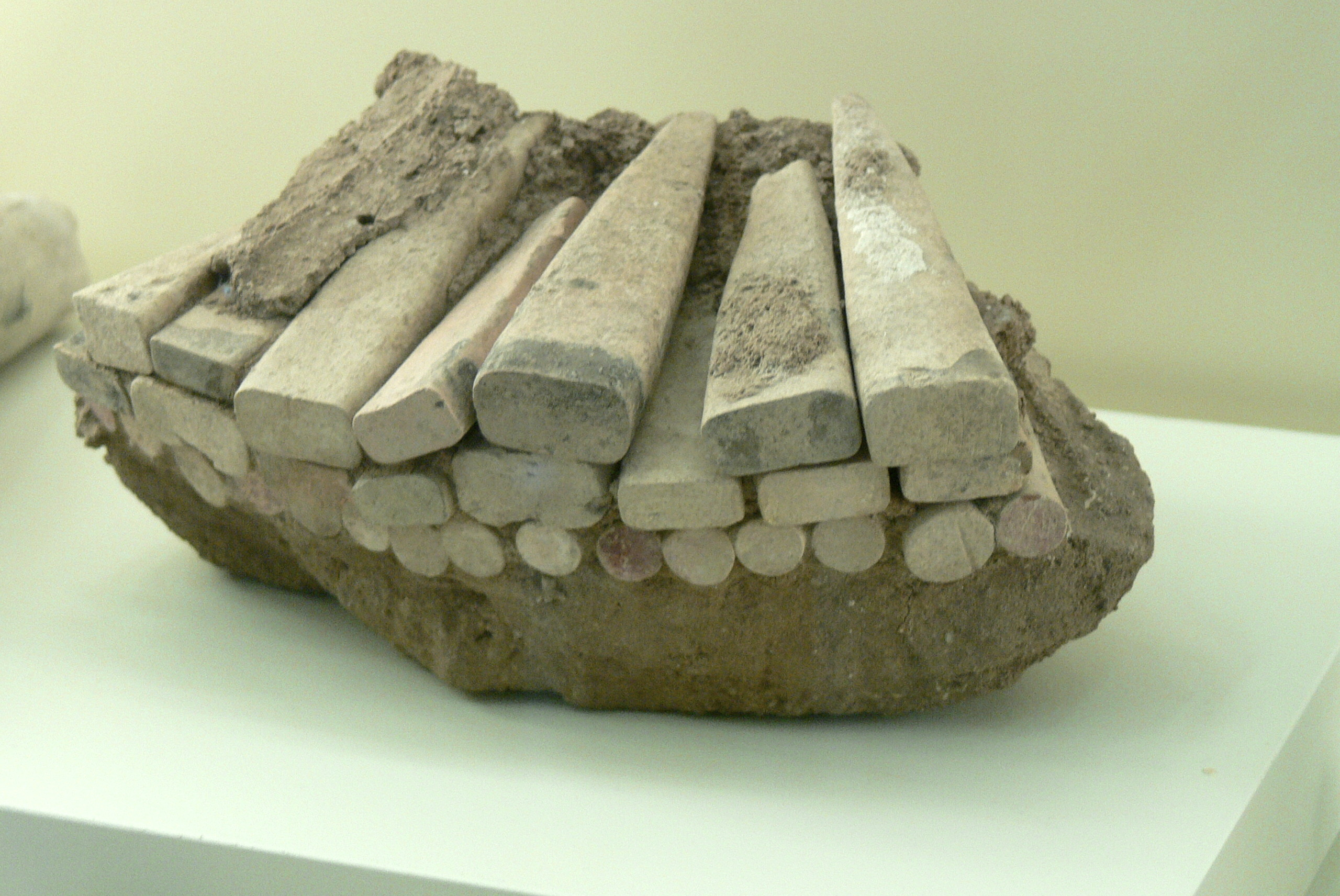
Stone cone mosaic detail

== See also ==
- Cities of the ancient Near East
- History of Mesopotamia
- Hacınebi Tepe
- Tilbeş Höyük
