= Tapeh Tyalineh =

Archaeological site in Iran

- Location within Iran
- 34°31′02.2″N 46°43′46.1″E
- Type: settlement
- Periods: Late Chalcolithic, Early Bronze Age
- Location: Kermanshah Province, Iran

History
- Built: 4th millennium BC

Site notes
- Excavation dates: 2021, 2023-2024
- Archaeologists: Mostafa Doosti, Siyavash Shahbazi, Sajjad Alibaig, Shokouh Khosravi
- Condition: Ruined
- Owner: Public
- Public access: Yes

Tapeh Tyalineh is an archaeological site in Kermanshah province, Iran on the Kouzaran plain of the Mahidasht region about 25 kilometers west of Chogha Maran.

== Archaeology ==
The site covers an area of about 2.7-hectares and rises about 2.5-meters above the plain. The Mereg River runs along the west of the site. The top of the mound has been plowed and cultivated by local peasants. The site was mentioned in a 1998 regional survey by Abbas Motarjem reporting "bichrome, Iron Age grey ware, and Parthian ceramics" on the surface and digging activity by villagers. Prompted by reports that villagers were digging and removing soil at the site (primarily in the area of the southwestern corner) Mostafa Doosti and Siyavash Shahbazi of the Ministry of Cultural Heritage, Tourism and Handicrafts office of Kermanshah conducted an initial surface survey finding 25 clay sealings and a figurine. A further survey later in the year by Mostafa Doosti and Sajjad Alibaig found 40 additional clay sealings. An initial estimate put the site at 100 meters in diameter with an area of 1 hectare. The sealings were primarily jar sealings with a few door sealings and mostly sealed by cylinder seals with a few by stamp seals. Associated pottery was from the Late Chalcolithic, Iron Age III, and Parthian periods and Uruk period bevelled rim bowl fragments were noted.

Two seasons of rescue excavations led by Shokouh Khosravi were conducted. In 2023 two trenches were opened, one 5 meters by 5 meters by 1.5 meters deep (Trench A) and one 1 meter by 1.5 meters by 4 meters deep (Trench B). Trench A, in an early 3rd Millennium BC rubbish pit, yielded 4019 clay sealings, 127 clay figurines, a number of spherical, pyramidal, and disk-shaped clay tokens, and 1 cylinder seal. In 2024 three more trenches were opened 7 meters by 7 meters (trench C), one 3 meters by 11 meters (Trench D), and one 6 meters by 4 meters (Trench E). In that season over 3000 clay sealings, 1 cylinder seal, a number of clay figurines, and dozens of clay tokens were found.

== History ==
Tapeh Tyalineh was primarily occupied in the early 3rd Millennium BC with pottery also being found as early as the late 4th Millennium BC. There are signs of minimal occupation in the Iron Age III and Parthian periods.

== See also ==
- Chronology of the ancient Near East
- Cities of the ancient Near East
- Shahdad
- Tepe Sialk
- Tell Yelkhi
