= Tall-e Geser =

Archaeological site in Iran

- Tall-i-Ghazir
- Location within Iran
- 29°56′09″N 52°53′23″E
- Type: settlement
- Location: Khuzestan Province, Iran

History
- Built: 5th Millennium BC

Site notes
- Excavation dates: 1948-1949
- Archaeologists: Donald E. McCown, Joseph Caldwell
- Condition: Ruined
- Owner: Public
- Public access: Yes

Tall-e Geser (also Tall-i-Ghazir, Tell-e Geser, Toll-e-Geser, and Tell-i Ghazir) is an archaeological site in Khuzestan province, Iran in the Ram Hormuz region, southeast of lowland Susiana. It was settled in the 5th millennium BC and, aside from a 900-year hiatus in the Early Dynastic period, occupied until the Early Medieval period.

== Archaeology ==
The site consists of a number of mounds (labeled A-J and the Fort Mound) and reached a maximum area of 3.5 hectares. The largest mound (Mound A) is about 200 meters long and rises to a height of about 24 meters above the plain. After being noted in a regional survey it was excavated for 17 days in 1948 by an Oriental Institute of Chicago team led by Donald E. McCown, using two sondages (Trenches I and II) on Mound A. In 1949 McCown, with Joseph Caldwell, returned to the site for a two-month excavation season. Two 5 meter by 45 meter trenches were dug on Mound A, one at the top of the mound (Stake Trench) and the other (step trench) on the slope. On Mound B a 13 meter by 5 meter trench to a depth of 5 meters was excavated, finding three graves of the Neo-Elamite period. On the Fort Mound a 5 meter by 28 meter trench was excavated finding six Neo-Elamite graves.

The region was again surveyed in 1969 by Henry Wright and Elizabeth Carter. A group led by Abbas Alizadeh then conducted a survey between 2005 and 2009. The site of Tall-i-Ghazir is now crisscrossed by roads, dirt roads, and tracks. There is extensive agriculture occurring with farms and date palm groves, with attendant irrigation canals. There are two modern villages, Geser Lower Village and Geser Upper Village on the site. Mounds H, I, and J have been destroyed by modern activity with Mound G being partially destroyed.

Finds included one fragmentary numerical tablet (originally identified as a Proto-Elamite tablet) found out of context, four stone geometric tokens, and one cylinder seal. A number of Uruk period beveled rim bowls, some inverted, were found. In a 2nd millennium BC grave a flint arrowheads were found. A number of terracotta human and animal figurines, sling bullets, and spindle whorls from various periods were also recovered and a "curved bronze dagger blade still in its original copper scabbard".

== History ==
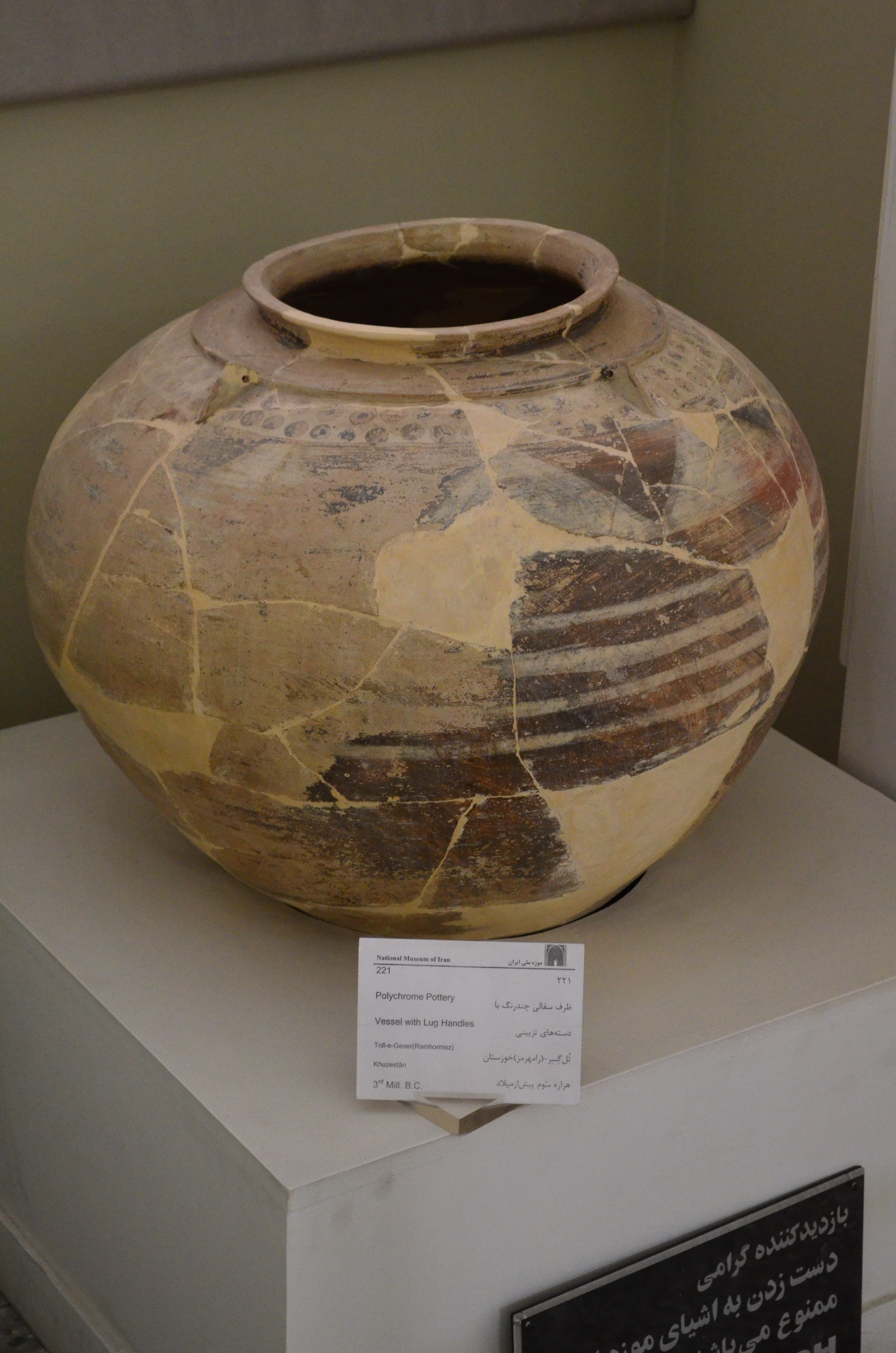
Polychrome pottery - Vessel with Lug Handles - Toll-e-Geser (Ramhormoz, Khuzestan province) - 3rd millennium BC - National Museum of Iran

The settlement was established in the 5th millennium BC and grew to be the largest in the region before being temporarily abandoned in the middle of the 3rd millennium BC. It was resettled in the Old Babylonian period and occupied fairly regularly until Medieval times.

Excavators have defined a stratigraphy for the site:

- Layer I/II/III - Ubaid 4 to Terminal Ubaid - 5200-3900 BC
- Layer IV/V - Uruk to Jemdat Nasr - 3900-2600 BC
- Period of Abandonment - 2600-1900 BC
- Layer VI - Old Babylonian to Kassite - 1900-1600 BC
- Layer VII/VIII - Middle Elamite to Neo-Elamite - 1600-550 BC
- Layer IX - Achaemenid Empire - 550-331 BC
- Layer X - Parthian - 331 BC to 241 AD
- Layer XI - Sassanian - 241 - 651 AD
- Layer XII - Post-Sassanian - 651 - 900 AD

== See also ==
- Chronology of the ancient Near East
- Cities of the ancient Near East
- Shahdad
- Tepe Sialk
- Tell Yelkhi
