= Tal-i-Iblis =

Archaeological site in Iran

Tal-e Eblis تل ابلیس

- Location within Iran
- 29.8508663°N 56.6814140°E
- Type: settlement
- Periods: Late Chalcolithic, Early Bronze Age
- Location: Dashtkar, Bardsir, Kerman Province, Iran

History
- Built: 4th millennium BC

Site notes
- Excavation dates: 1964, 1966
- Archaeologists: Joseph Caldwell
- Condition: Ruined
- Owner: Public
- Public access: Yes

Iran National Heritage List
- Official name: Tal-e Eblis
- Type: Mound
- Designated: 1965
- Reference no.: 490
- Conservation organization: Cultural Heritage, Handicrafts and Tourism Organization of Iran

Tal-e Eblis (also Tal-i Iblis and Tell-i Iblis), known locally as "the devil's mound" is an archaeological site in Kerman province, Iran. It is located about 80 kilometers southwest of Kerman, and 170 kilometers north/northwest of Tepe Yahya. It was mostly destroyed by local peasants stealing soil to replenish the agriculture land depleted by their agricultural practices before it could be excavated by archaeologists. Enough was left to provide some important insights into the settlement history. The site was occupied primarily in the 4th millennium BC. It is not a natural hill, rather the accumulated remains of a millennia of occupation.

== History ==
Excavators defined the stratigraphy as having six periods with the presence of flint tools coarse straw-tempered pottery suggesting that there had been earlier occupation (the damaged nature of the site made periodization difficult and subsequent publications have somewhat clouded this issue):

- Period 0 - tentative earlier occupation level which was later deprecated
- Periods I-II - c. 4200-4000 BC. Equivalent to Ubaid 5, Susa I and Yahya VA-VC. Chalcolithic
- Periods III-V - c. 3500 BC. Equivalent to Uruk period. EBA
- Period VI - c. 3000 BC. Equivalent to Jemdet Nasr, Proto-Elamite, and Yahya IVC. EBA

Trade. Finds included turquoise, carnelian, and shell beads, a few figurines, and a few calcite cups.

Finds included beveled rim bowls and four-lugged jars, in Periods IV through VI, which are diagnostic pottery for the Uruk culture. A few small conic clay tokens were also found.

Metallurgy. A notable discovery was one of the earliest copper smelting workshops in the Old World dated to the early fifth millennium BC. The nearby mountain range has significant copper deposits including native copper. The early debate about whether activity at the site was actual smelting or simply the melting of native copper has been resolved in favor of smelting. A number of copper finds were recovered being found in all levels. These included pins, awls, rings, nails, and ornaments. A number of crucibles were found, primarily on earlier levels.

=== Radiocarbon dating ===
Some radiocarbon dates were obtained. Note that these are early pre-AMS dates and publications do not specify calibration method though it was mentioned that the then new C-14 half-life value of 5730 ± 40 was used. These dates were controversial and later corrections were proposed.

- Period I (Iblis 1): 4091 BC ± 74 - Corrected to 5290-4420 BC
- Period II (Iblis 2): 4083 BC ± 75 - Corrected to 5205-4685 BC
- Period III (Iblis 3): 3792 BC ± 60 - Corrected to 4460-4400 BC
- Period IV (Iblis 4): 3645 BC ± 59 - Corrected to 4415-3365 BC
- Period V (Iblis 5): 2869 BC ± 57

== Archaeology ==
The site was visited in 1932 by archaeologist Sir Aurel Stein during a reconnaissance of the area. He was prevented from examining or sketching the site by a local military official. He described the site, at that time, as having an oval shape, 118 meters by 100 meters, and around 11 meters high with pottery indicating the presence of a lower town (with pottery shards extending 1200 meters to the north and south and 800 meters to the east and west). Stein noted that locals had been removing soil from the site for an extended period. When the site was next examined, for 2 days in 1964 by archaeologist Joseph Caldwell, the reported the "entire center of this large mound had been dug out and destroyed" and men were seen shoveling dirt into a truck. The only upside was that the damage exposed the stratigraphy of the site, easily discernible by changes in pottery. Samples were taken for radiocarbon dating. Tal-i-Iblis was excavated for two months in 1966 by an Illinois State Museum team led by Joseph Caldwell. Metallurgist Cyril Stanley Smith also visited the site at that time to remove samples for analysis. By this time the site had been destroyed down to what was later deemed Period I though a few later remains were to be found at the very margins of the mound. Seven excavations (A-G) were opened. Area A was a deep probe in the center of the mound, Areas B and C behind the profile of the mound remnant, and area E was a trash dump well northwest of the mound, and Areas D and G were in the center of the mound but shallow. Some building remains were found in areas F, and G.

== See also ==
- Chronology of the ancient Near East
- Cities of the ancient Near East
- Shahdad
- Tepe Sialk
- Tell Yelkhi
