= Tilbeş Höyük =

Archaeological site in Turkey

- Location within Turkey
- 37.0888°N 37.8734°E
- Type: settlement
- Periods: Late Chalcolithic, Early Bronze, Iron Age
- Location: Şanlıurfa Province, Turkey

History
- Built: 4th millennium BC

Site notes
- Excavation dates: 1996-1999
- Archaeologists: Jesüs GiI Fuensanta, Adnan Misir
- Condition: Ruined
- Owner: Public
- Public access: No

Tilbeş Höyük is an ancient Near East archaeological site inundated by the Birecik Dam located in Şanlıurfa Province in southeastern Turkey. It lies on the left bank of the upper Euphrates river across the river from the Horum Höyük archaeological site. Its primary occupation was during the Early Bronze period. There was originally a modern town, Keskince Köyü, at the base of the mound but it has now been submerged by the action of the dam and the remaining part of the mound of Tilbeş Höyük is only reachable by boat.

== Archaeology ==
The site, originally covering about 3 hectares, was excavated as part of a rescue archaeology effort of the Spanish Archaeological Mission to Turkey and the University of Alicante led by Jesüs GiI Fuensanta and Adnan Misir. The work at Tilbeş Höyük was part of salvage archaeology at sites endangered by dam construction and included Tilmusa Höyük, Tilöbür, Surtepe Höyük, and Tilvez Höyük. It began in 1996 with surveys.

- Tilmusa Höyük - 9 meter high conical mound with an area of 0.45 hectares, cut on the western part by the river. Also called Apamea though it is not fully clear which of the slew of places with this name is intended.
- Tilöbur - conical mound with an area of about 1.44 hectares and a stratigraphical depth of 6 meters located 2.2 kilometers west Tilmusa Höyük
- Tilvez Höyük - 9 meter high double conical mound with an area of about 3.5 hectares at the base and about 1.2 hectares at the top of the mound. Survived inundation though most of the Early Dynastic level has been destroyed by the construction of a concrete factory.
- Surtepe Höyük - 20 hectares in area with a city wall. Halfway between Samsat and Carchemish and 7 kilometers south of Birecik.

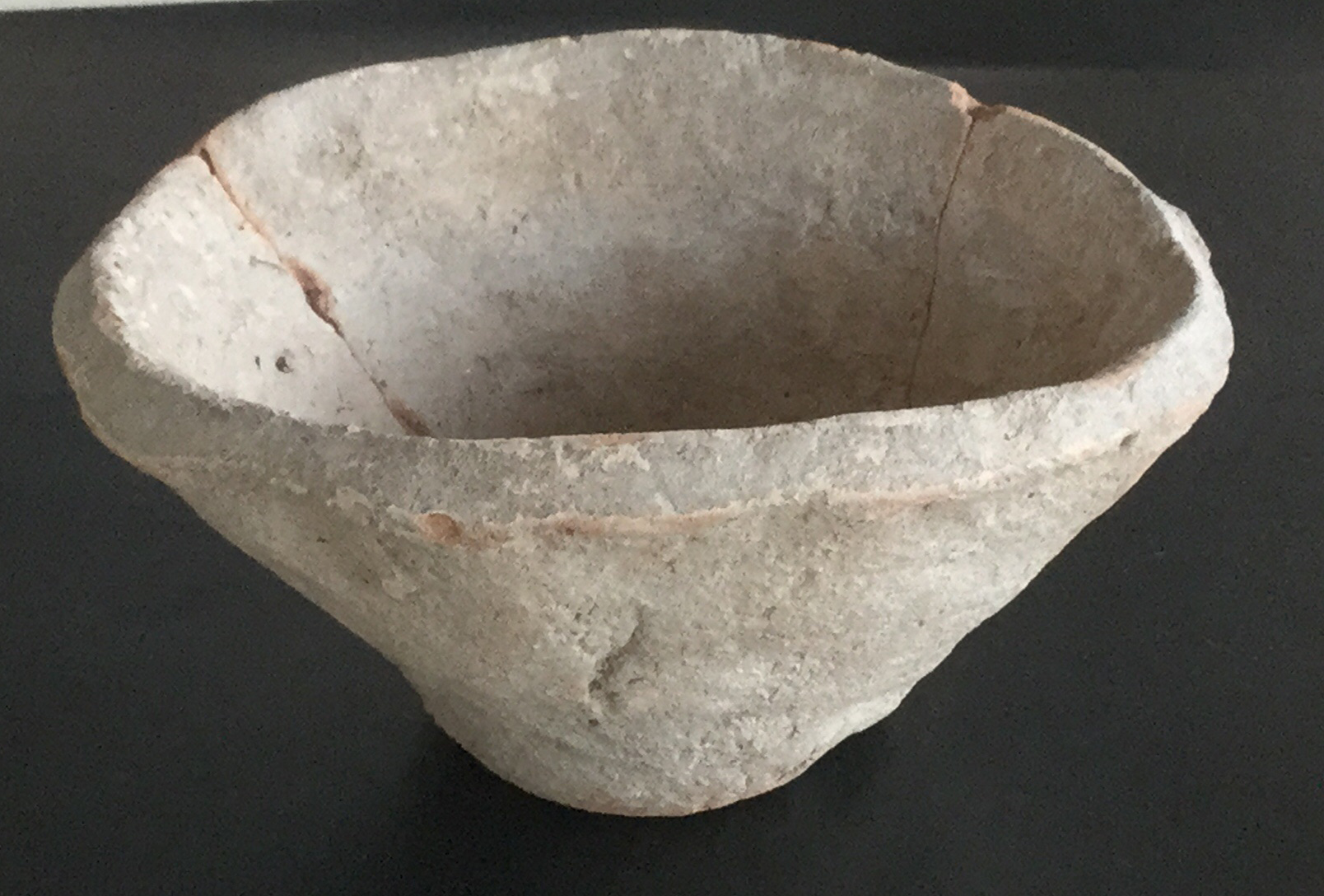
Bevelled-rim bowl from Habuba Kabira South, Syria. Late Uruk period, c. 3400-3200 BC

Work at the site ran from 1996 to 1999. Work began in two areas, the west (sector A) and the south (sector E). The western side of the Tilbeş Höyük (originally 3 hectares in area) had been eroded away in antiquity so the current western portion would originally have been in the center of the mound and the mound had an area of about 1.5 hectares. It measured 110 meters by 100 meters and with a cultural deposit of at least 14.5 meters. A 2.5 meter by 2.5 meter deep sounding (in area AE1-5) was excavated at that point reaching virgin soil at 12 meters. Under a hiatus layer Late Chalcolithic occupation was found and finds were various Uruk sherds and beveled rim bowls. A Uruk period "fruit-stand" (Fruchtstandeller) was found in a cist grave. A square test pit (B1) was dug at the northern part. A 5 meter by 5 meter square (E4b) later expanded by a trench was dug in the south-southwest portion of the mound. In an Early Bronze I occupation layer a mud brick building was found and a tomb (intrusive into the lower Late Chalcolithic layer). The tomb contained "a few goblets, champagne cups with reserved slip, a pin and some beads" and a single human skeleton. Below a hiatus level Late Chalcolithic occupation was found. After the main site was submerged erosion exposed the Terminal Ubaid sub-site of Tilbes-Körçe and from 2001 until 2004 the Spanish Archaeological Mission in Turkey excavated there along with doing post excavation study of the Tilbeş Höyük work. Over 450 square meters were worked and about 12 buildings found.

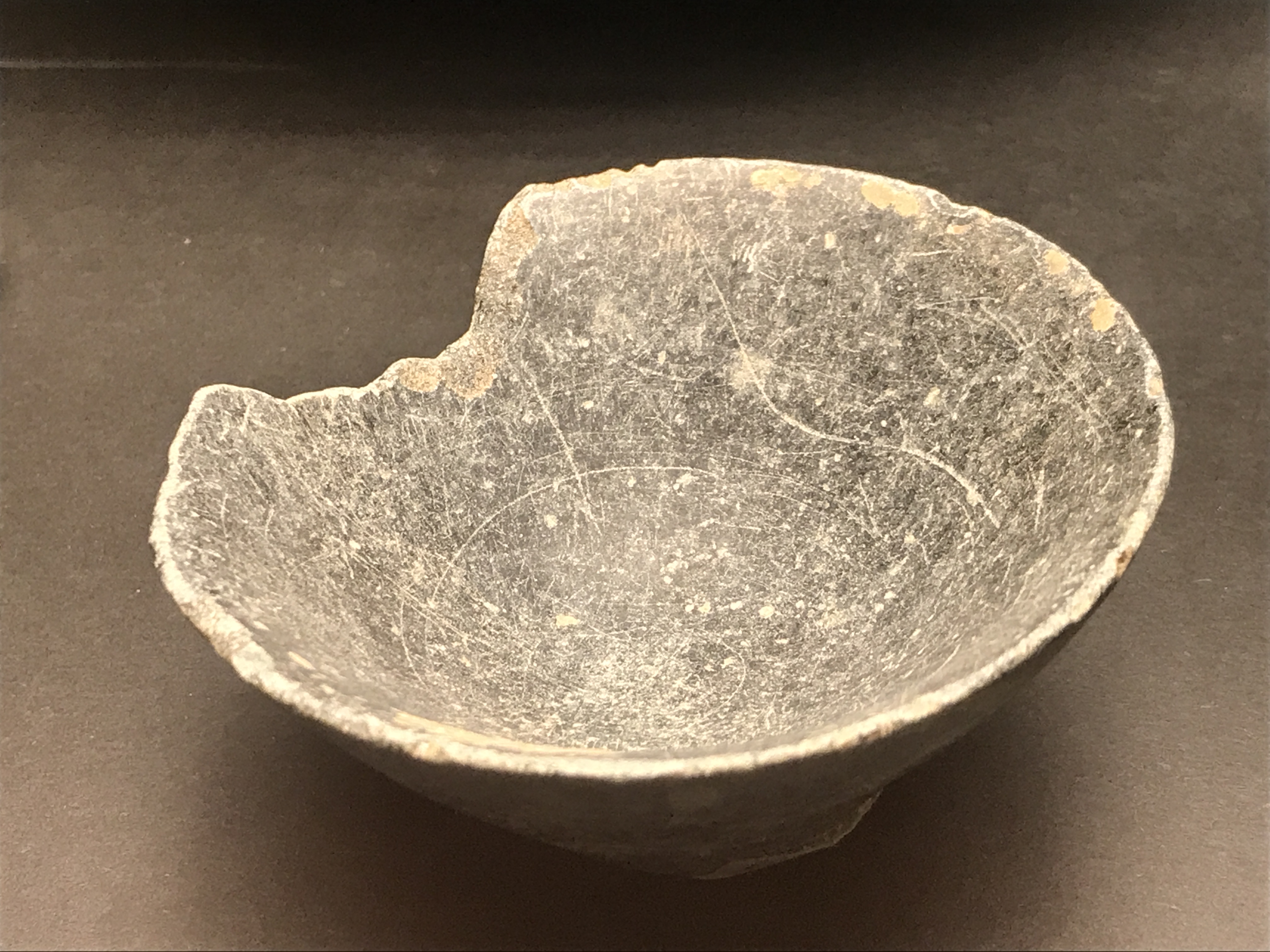
Archaeological Museum of the University of Münster - Coba Bowl

In the center of the mound (E4aE3E) a multi-roomed stone built shrine with a west facing entrance was found with three construction layers, Early Bronze I, Early Bronze II, and Early Bronze III and included two stone cist graves with infant burials (EB II). It was built atop a mud brick platform and the most recent was destroyed by fire. Finds in that building included a number of clay horns, terracotta goddess figurines. Though the structure was out of use the area was occupied to an extent in the Early Bronze IV period, with suggestions of building walls, burials and finds of figurines. The excavators interpreted this as the site of a fertility cult. On the Early Bronze III level two radiocarbon dates (method and calibration unknown) using samples from that were determined 2890-2584 ± 45 BC and 2830-2461 ± 45 BC. On the Early Bronze I level three radiocarbon dates (method and calibration unknown) were determined from building and tomb contexts yielding dates of 3491-3039 ± 50 BC, 3351-2920 ± 50 BC, and 3082-2876 ± 50 BC.

Finds at Tilbeş Höyük included remains of a bulla, numerical token, flint, obsidian, and basalt artifacts as well as sherds with traces of cuneiform characters referring to volume capacities and a sherd of a Coba bowl. Metal grave goods in the form of 6 pins were also found.

=== Iron Age ===
In the Iron Age occupation level an Egyptian scarab was found, dated approximately to the 26th dynasty (664–525 BC). An out of context cylinder seal was found with dating to the early 2nd millennium BC (proposed reading 1, ^{d}Nergal (Ne₃‑iri₁₁‑g[al]) 2. u₃ ^{d}Ma‑mi‑tum). The cuneiform inscription had been recut to interpret the figures on the seal as being "Nergal and his consort Mammitum".

== History ==
The site was occupied in the Late Chalcolithic (Proto-Ubaid, Late Ubaid, Uruk), Early Bronze Age (into the Middle Bronze Age transition period), Middle Bronge Age and, after a long hiatus, lightly in the Achaemenid, Hellenistic, Seleucid, Roman and Islamic Periods. The excavators determined an occupation periodization for the site:

- Late Chalcolithic 5th to middle 4th millennium BC - Proto-Ubaid through Middle–Late Uruk
- EBA I - 3490–2875 BC - Construction of 1st central shrine
- EBA II - 2800–2600 BC - Shrine rebuilt
- EBA III - 2890–2460 BC - Shrine rebuilt and ended in destruction
- EBA IV / EBA–MBA transition - 2500–2000 BC
- MBA I–II - 2000–1750/1700 BC
- Long period of abandonment
- Middle Iron Age - 8th–6th centuries BC
- Late Iron Age / Achaemenid - 6th–4th centuries BC
- Hellenistic - 4th–1st centuries BC
- Roman - 1st century BC–3rd/4th century AD
- Islamic early medieval to later periods.

== See also ==
- Cities of the ancient Near East
- Habuba Kabira
- Hacınebi Tepe
- Hassek Höyük
- Kenan Tepe
- Üçtepe Höyük
