= Coba bowl =

Coba bowls (with a capacity of about 1.4 liters) were widely produced, primarily in northern Mesopotamia but also found in the surrounding region, between c. 4600 BC and c. 4200 BC, in the transition between the late Ubaid period and early Uruk period becoming a predominant form at that time. This time period is variously called Terminal Ubaid, Ubaid 5, and Late Chalcolithic 1. They were expediently made, unpainted and coarse, with vegetable temper, frequently flint-scraped on the lower exterior, and in quantities, reminiscent of beveled rim bowls. Their appearance reflected a marked change in pottery tradition at the time. They have been proposed as the predecessor of beveled rim bowls. The type was first identified at Coba Höyük. It has been suggested that they acted as ration bowls in the same manner as beveled rim bowls may have in the Uruk period.

== Type description ==
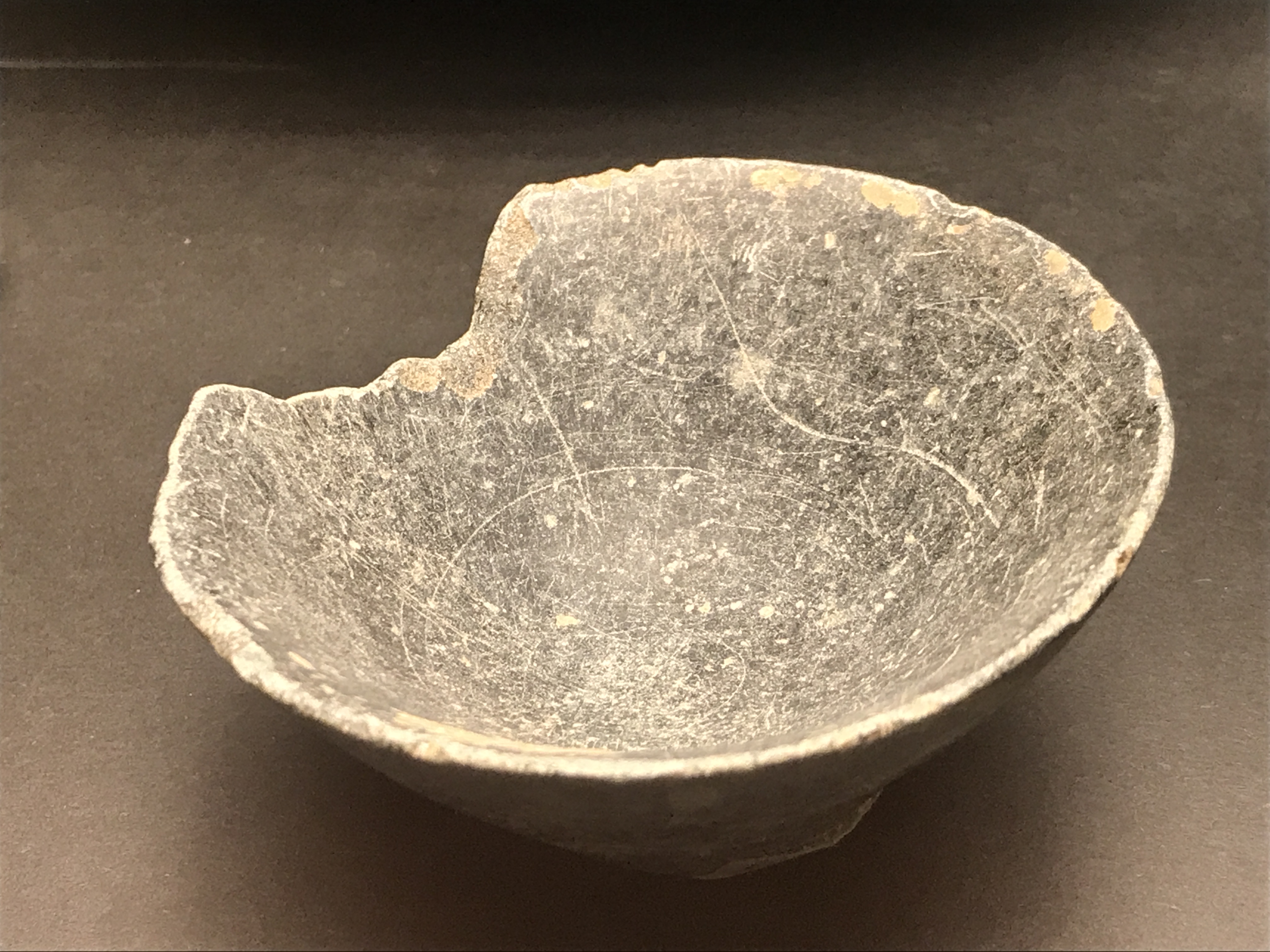
Archaeological Museum of the University of Münster - Coba Bowl

When Coba bowls (in the category of Mass Produced Bowls) were found at Coba Höyük two types were defined, one beige/grey coarse ware with mixed grit and organic temper and one more finished and with reddish hues. Since then the definition has expanded as more exemplars were found at other sites. The similar "Wide Flower-Pots" are considered by some researchers to be a local variant of Coba bowls those this is debated.

Subsequently, the definition of Coba bowls expanded to cover a class of post-Ubaid pottery. This coarse, unpainted, and mass produced pottery class differed markedly from the painted fineware of the Ubaid period. In general Coba bowls are most rounded in western areas and more "v-shaped" in eastern areas. Currently Coba bowls are group into four rough classes:

- Type I - mostly eastern, flat disc base separately produced, rounded sides, found in Tell Abu Husseini, Tell Leilan, Tepe Gawra, Kurban and Norşuntepe
- Type II - low, convex walls, round base, hand smoothed and scraped, found at Tell Feres, Tell Afis, Oylum Höyük, Tabara el Akrad, Sakçe Gözü, Hammam et-Turkman, Horum Höyük, Tell esh-Sheikh, Tell al-‘Abr, Tell Leilan, Abu Husseini, Norşuntepe, Ziyada, and Chagar Bazar
- Type III - similar to Type II with higher walls flint scraped lower exterior and a flat base, found throughout the region including Değirmentepe, Arslantepe, and Arpachiya
- Type IV - "Wide Flower-Pots", mostly eastern, conical with unscraped flat bottom, made using coils, found at Grai Resh, Norşuntepe, Tell al-Hawa, Tell Brak, Nineveh, Nuzi, and Telul eth-Thalathat

== Distribution ==
While primarily found in Northern Mesopotamia, Coba bowls have been found in quantity at sites in Anatolia and modern day Syria and Iran.

At Tell Hammam et-Turkman Phase VA scraped Coba bowls account for more than 50% of the assemblage. At Tell Zeidan the LC1 ceramics Coba bowls were 29%, and in the LC2 wide flowerpots they were 28%. Soundings at the medieval period Harim Castle (Castrum Harenc) in Syria found fragments of Coba bowls. At Değirmentepe (Malatya) Coba bowls were found (Building BC-15, Building I-9, Building FC-2, Building DU-2). Coba bowls were found at Tepe Gawra and sherds at Kenan Tepe. A large number were found on the Late Chalcolithic Level XV at Yumuktepe (Mersin). At Salat Tepe numerous Coba sherds were found at the phase 1B level. Also at Tell al 'Abr, Tell Afis, Tilbeş Höyük, Girdi Qala and Logardan, Tell Tawila, and Tell Leilan.

== See also ==
- Beveled rim bowls
