= Jerablus Tahtani =

- Location within Syria
- 36°48′00″N 38°01′00″E
- Type: settlement
- Periods: Late Chalcolithic, Bronze Age, Iron Age
- Location: Syria

History
- Built: 4th millennium BC

Site notes
- Excavation dates: 1992-1999
- Archaeologists: Edgar Peltenburg
- Condition: Ruined
- Owner: Public
- Public access: Yes

Jerablus Tahtani (formerly Tell Alawiyeh) is a small tell on the right bank of the Euphrates River four kilometers south of Carchemish in present-day Syria.

== Archaeology ==
The mound has an area of 1 hectare with a surrounding lower town covering about 12 hectares. The mound has been somewhat eroded on the east side by the Euphrates and currently is 180 by 220 meters in extent and rises 16 meters above the plain. A 300 square meter Early Bronze age (3rd Millennium BC) fort, built on the ashes of a burnt village, stood on the mound. The c. 2700 BC defensive wall exceeded 12 meters in height, is preserved to a height of 6 meters, and included a later added 12 meter wide white plastered glacis. A number of monumental tombs were found. One tomb (Tomb 302), 15 meters by 10 meters by 2.5 meters built with large transversely laid, undressed limestone blocks and with two chambers, eastward oriented and sited just outside the wall of the fort, contained, ivory dagger pommels, a large number of "champagne vessels" and animal bones which were interpreted as evidence of mortuary feasting. It was topped by a 8 meter by 10 meter by 2 meter mound. The main chamber measured 6.6 meters by 2 meters and was built with corbelled walls. The tomb had been looted at some point. In a later period, c. 2500 BC, metal weapons were deposited in the tomb including three spearheads, twelve daggers, and two axes. Several stone lined cist graves and a pit grave were also found. Finds in those included "figurines, decorated bone, pins, daggers, silver earrings, and beads and pendants made of gold, carnelian rock crystal and shell".

The site was first noted by Leonard Woolley early the 1920s while he was excavating at nearby Carchemish. It was examined and mapped during a regional survey in the late 1970s. It was excavated from 1992 to 2000 by a University of Edinburgh and British Institute at Amman for Archaeology and History team led by Edgar Peltenburg as part of the Syrian government's Tishrin Dam rescue project. Finds included beveled rim bowls, diagnostic pottery of the Uruk period. As of 2000 the site was still not underwater. This project successively developed into the Land of Carchemish project.

== History ==
The site was occupied from the late Uruk period through the middle 3rd Millennium BC. Then, after a hiatus, it was occupied from the Iron Age through the Islamic period. Specifically, there were 5 occupation periods:

- Period 1 - Late Chalcolithic - Mostly under EBAIII overburden and unexcavated in time available.
- Period 2 - Early Bronze Age III
- Period 3 - Late Iron Age
- Period 4 - Hellenistic/Roman
- Period 5 - Islamic

== See also ==
- Cities of the ancient Near East
- Jerf el Ahmar
