= Tepe Farukhabad =

- Location within Iran
- 32°35′00″N 47°14′00″E
- Type: settlement
- Periods: Late Chalcolithic, Bronze Age
- Location: Ilam province, Iran

History
- Built: 5th millennium BC

Site notes
- Excavation dates: 1968
- Archaeologists: Henry Wright
- Condition: Ruined
- Owner: Public
- Public access: Yes

Tepe Farukhabad (also Teppe Farukhabad and Tapeh Farukhabad) is an ancient Near Eastern archaeological site located in the Deh Luran Plain (Dehloran Plain) which is primarily in the southwest of modern-day Iran. In lies in the Ilam province. It is 110 kilometers west-northwest of Andimeshk and 12 miles south of the village of Deh Luran. On a visit to the site in 1997 military damage was found (foxholes, trenches for light artillery, and several grenade and mortar craters) and due to erosion "big clumps of the mound have recently collapsed down the nearly vertical slope facing the river".

== Archaeology ==
The site was first noted by a French mission led by Joseph Étienne Gautier and Georges Lampre in 1903. An examination of the site in 1968 found 5th millennium BC Susiana pottery sherds and 4th millennium BC beveled rim bowls. The site has a small high mound and surrounding lower town and has been cut by a local river which has removed about 60% of its original area to the south. The overall site extends 190 meters from northwest to southeast and 140 meters from northeast to southwest. The central high mound extends 150 meters from northwest to southeast, and 70 meters from northeast to southwest. and rises about 30 meters above the plain of which about 20 meters is occupational remains.

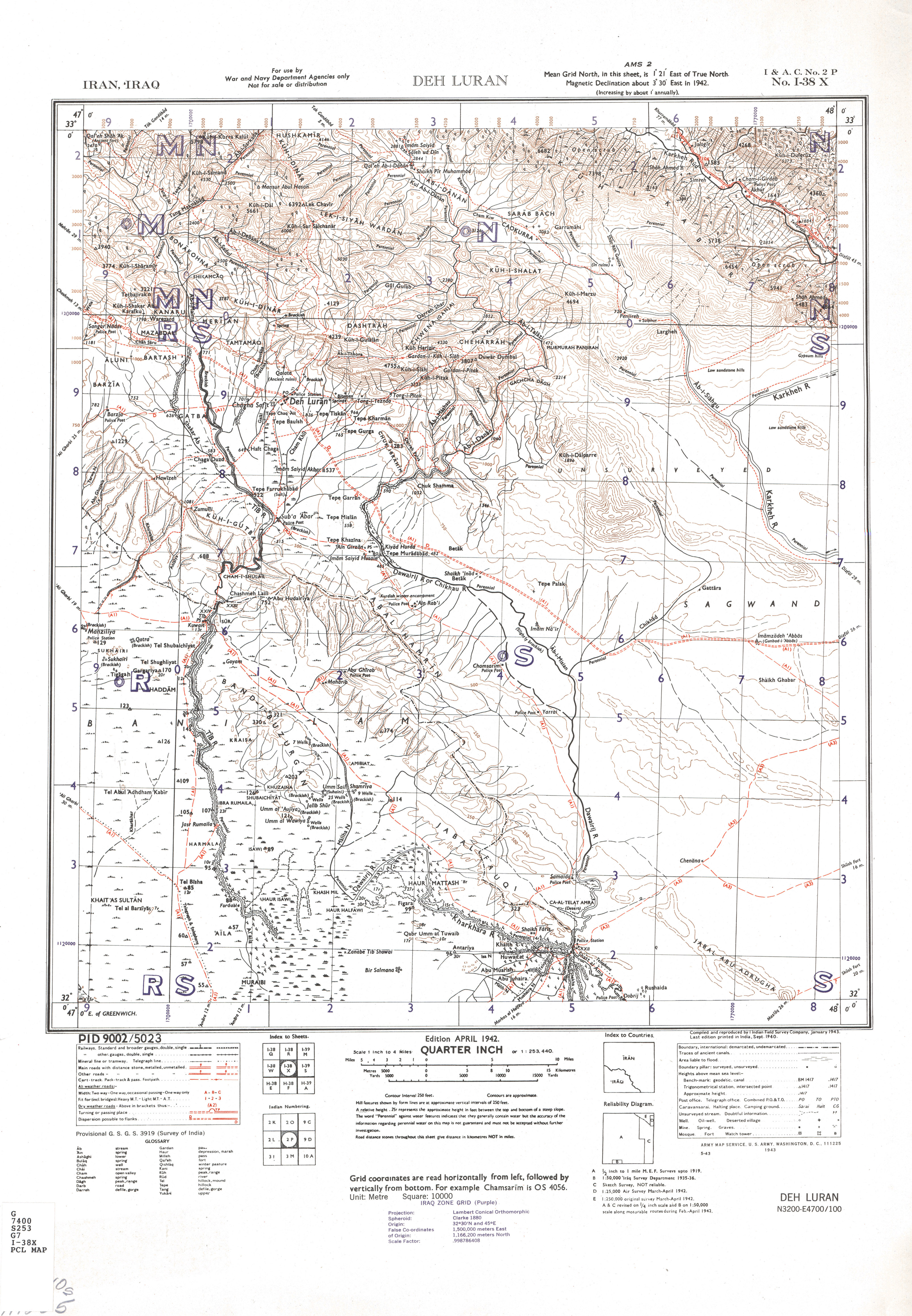
Map by the US Army Map Service - Deh Luran - Iraq and Iran

The site was worked for a single season over two months in 1968 by a team from the University of Michigan Museum of Anthropology, with 30 workers, led by Henry Wright. Two 5 meter by 14 meter step trenches (designated Trenches A and B, spaced 45 meters apart along the southwest side of the mound) and one 1 meter by 17 meter trench (Trench C, north face top of mound, depth of 12 meters) were excavated. Bayat and Faukh phase finds included mainly pottery, lithics (microliths, sickle blades, scrappers, etc.), one button seal, and bone tools. Uruk period finds included ceramic ring scrapers, 20 beveled rim bowls, clay stoppers, and conical cups, all diagnostic pottery for the Uruk culture, as well as a single wall cone. Five Middle Uruk burials were excavated. At Tepe Farukhabad BRB diameters ranged from 15 to 31 centimeters. The beveled rim bowls were associated with massive mudbrick building foundations. A silver wire and a fishhook were found in a Jemdat Nasr context.

Bitumen is available at Tepe Farukhabad (a still active seep is at Ain Gir to the north-northwest of the site) and it has been suggested that the Uruk period development was driven by bitumen production and export. Bones of domestic cattle were found in Early, Middle, and Late Uruk periods.

The only epigraphic find at the site, in a Middle Uruk context, was a clay ball token envelope with three sealings and possibly some numerical signs.

There was a proposal that the site was the location of Urua though consensus is with that being Tepe Musiyan, 12.5 kilometers to the east.

== History ==
Tepe Farukhabad was occupied, with periods of abandonment, from the late 5th millennium BC until the late 2nd millennium BC.

- c. 4200 BC – 4400 BC - Bayat and Faukh phases
- Abandonment
- c. 3900 BC – 2350 BC - Uruk period, Jemdat Nasr, Early Dynastic periods
- Abandonment
- c. 2100 BC – 1300 BC - Šimaški, Sukkalmah and Early Elamite periods.

A sounding in the lower town found several meters of Parthian and Sasanian remains. Structural remains on the summit, originally thought to be from the Islamic era, were on later analysis dated to the Parthian and Sasanian eras.

== See also ==
- Chronology of the ancient Near East
- List of cities of the ancient Near East
- Tepe Sialk
- Tell Yelkhi
