= Tell Humeida =

Tell Humeida is an archaeological site in Deir ez-Zor Governorate, Syria situated on the eastern bank of the middle Euphrates. A Syrian-Spanish team excavated the site in 2011 as a part of the Middle Syrian Euphrates Project (Spanish acronym PAMES). That team identified three phases of occupation, corresponding with the Byzantine, middle Uruk, and Ubaid periods. In modern history, the site was used as an Islamic cemetery where it was known as Tell Fuhhar due to the abundance of ceramics.

== Byzantine Period ==
Byzantine remains were identified in two trenches: one on the western slope of the tell and another in the lower city. In the lower city, a three-room structure including a balnearium paralleled other regional finds of Byzantine period baths. On the main tell, a basalt and limestone socle of two courses was identified that supported the fortified adobe walls of the main tell.

It is contended by the project leads Juan-Luis Montero Fenollós and Yaroob al-Abdallah that this site reflected a Roman settlement along the important limes between the themselves and Sassanians. Such defensive structures were established as castella by Diocletian and were later refortified by Justinian I.

== Middle Uruk Period ==
Below the layer of Byzantine occupation were three stratigraphic layers dating to the Uruk period. The first and most recent stratum yielded a small course of a mud brick wall that had been damaged by the construction of the Byzantine wall. Such mud bricks conformed to the type called riemchen.

In the second stratum, the site yielded a significant number of beveled rim bowls providing evidence for occupation during the Uruk period. Of the Uruk period pottery found at the site, BRBs constituted 80%. Such ceramics are generally believed to be used for the early production of leavened bread and their regularity allowed for the consistent rationing of grain and oil as payment for services.

Significant organic finds in the second stratum allow for the use of radiocarbon dating. Based on charcoal and bone dates found in this layer, C14 analyses returned non-calibrated dates of 4820-4705±45 BP.

The third and oldest stratum yielded another mud brick wall preserved at multiple courses.

== Late Ubaid Period ==
The only remnants from the late Ubaid period were three fragments of a ceramic sickle indicative of this period.
