= Hacınebi Tepe =

Archaeological site in Turkey

- Location within Turkey
- 37°58′32″N 37°3′35″E
- Type: Settlement
- Periods: Uruk period, Hellenistic
- Location: Şanlıurfa Province, Turkey

History
- Built: 4th millennium BC

Site notes
- Excavation dates: 1992–1997
- Archaeologists: Gil Stein, Adnan Misir
- Condition: Ruined
- Owner: Public
- Public access: Yes

Hacınebi Tepe (also Hacinebi Tepe) is an ancient Near East archaeological site 3.5 km (2.2 mi) north of the modern town of Birecik and near the Euphrates river crossing between Apamea and Zeugma in Şanlıurfa Province, Turkey. The area marks the northernmost easily navigable route of the Euphrates River. The site was occupied in the 4th millennium BC by a local population, joined by an enclave of the Uruk culture in the middle of that millennium. It was then abandoned aside from occasional use for burials, until the Hellenistic period when it was again fully occupied. The sites final use was as a Roman farmstead.

== Archaeology ==
Hacınebi Tepe covers an area of about 3.3 hectares and was excavated from 1992 until 1997 by a joint Sanliurfa Museum and Northwestern University team led by Gil Stein and Adnan Misir. A total of 18 trenches were excavated to an area of about 1400 square meters. Bedrock was reached in three areas (A, B, and C). Below the plow layer lies a 2.5 meter thick Hellenistic period layer. Below this is a 5-meter thick Late Chalcolithic period layer.

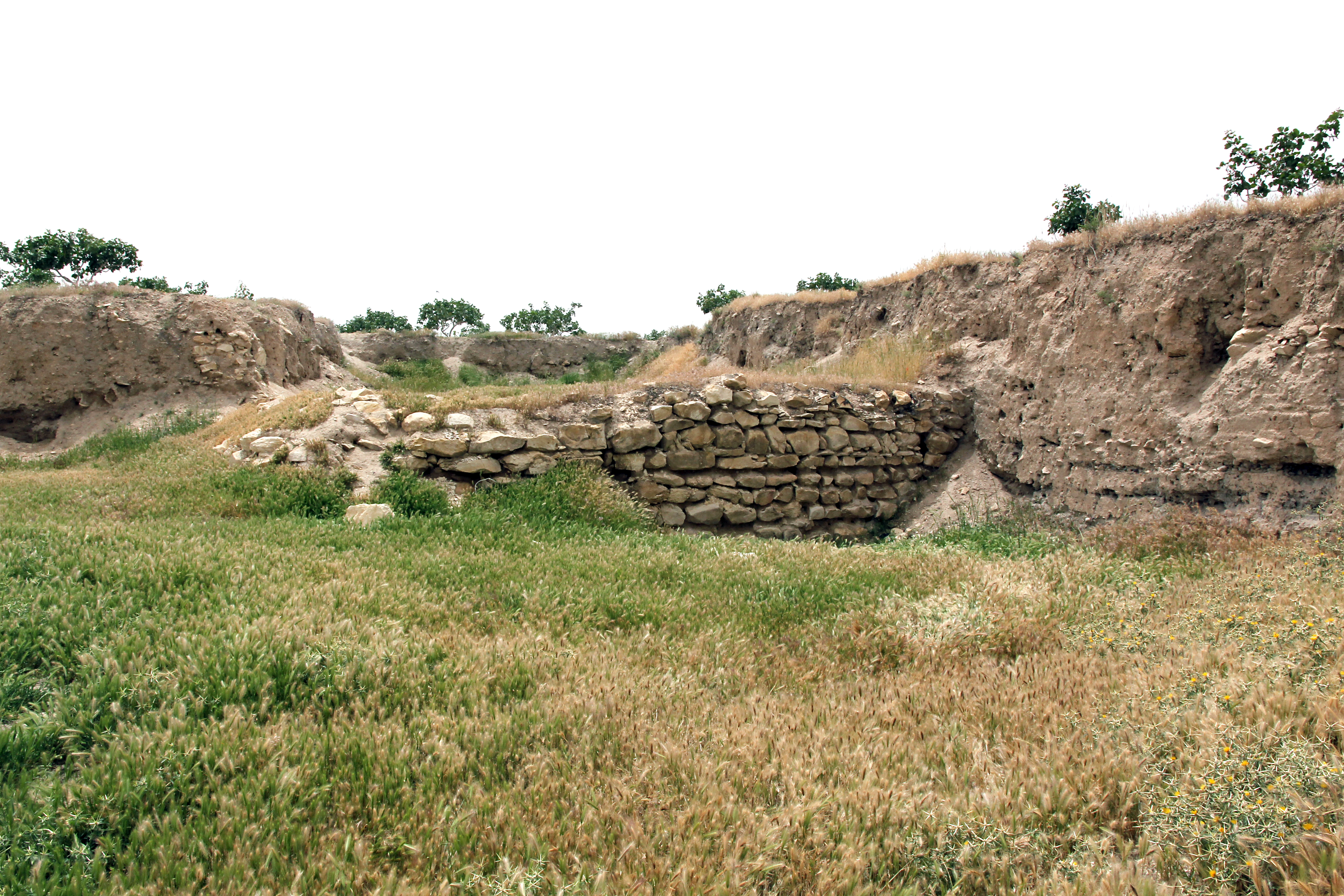
Hacinebi

The pre-Uruk community at the site included a significant full range copper production industry. A number of furnaces, mold fragments, and slag were found. The nearest sources of ore are at least 200 km (120 mi) away so raw material would have been acquired in trade. Finished product was small copper ingots though a copper chisel and copper pins were also found. A large number of lithic remains were found, including Canaanean blades, with different styles reflecting the local and Uruk populations.

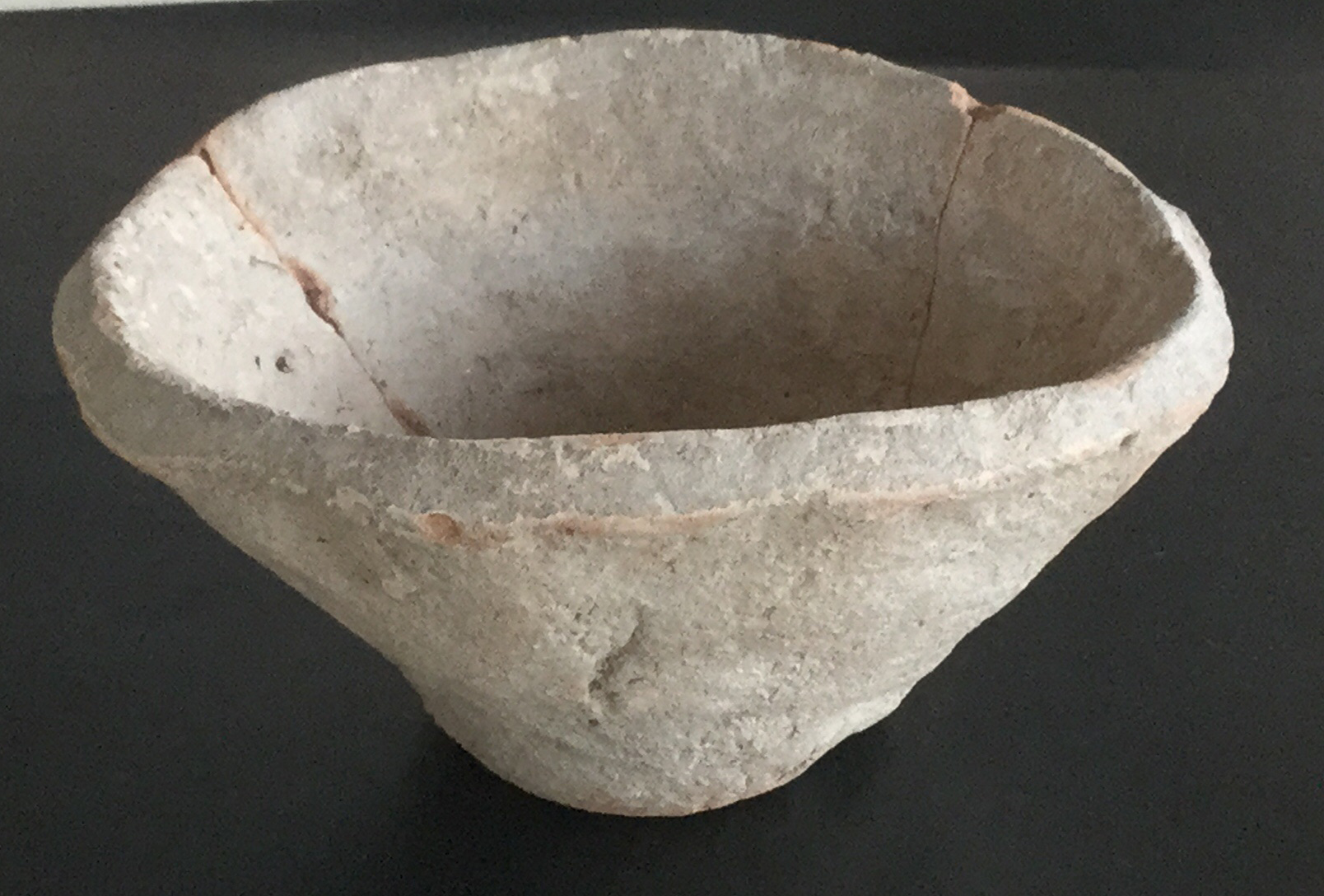
Uruk period Bevelled Rim Bowl

Twelve protoliterate tokens (10 spheres and 2 disks) were found at the site. They were inside a clay Uruk period bulla, the only one recovered in Turkey, sealed with two cylinder seals. Other Uruk finds included Beveled rim bowls and bitumen dipped baked clay wall cones. Bitumen was used for a variety of purposes at the site throughout the 4th millennium BC. A single fragmentary slab at the Uruk site of Hacınebi has been proposed as a numerical tablet, a predecessor of Proto-cuneiform. A blank tablet was also found.

It has been suggested that some of the clay sealings found at the site came from the area of modern Iran.

In the Hellenistic level a large mudbrick building and defensive fortifications were excavated and finds included a coin of Alexander the Great.

== History ==
Uruk expansion and colonial outposts

While a few Ubaid period and Pre-Pottery Neolithic B ceramic shards were found primary occupation of the site began in the 4th millennium BC. In the first half of that millennium a local population arose at the site (Hacinebi phases A and B1), joined in the later half of the millennium by an enclave from the Uruk expansion (Hacinebi phase B). The Uruk arrival is radiocarbon dated to the period from 3700 BC to 3400 BC, in the Middle Uruk period. The site was subsequently used as a burial area in the Early Bronze I period (one small structure was found) and Achaemenid periods with occupation resuming in the Hellenistic and, to a lesser extent, Roman periods before finally being abandoned permanently.

- Late Chalcolithic phase A - c. 4100–3800 BC - Late Chalcolithic 2
- Late Chalcolithic phase B1 - c. 3800–3700 BC - Late Chalcolithic 3
- Late Chalcolithic phase B2a–b - c. 3700–3200 BC - Uruk contact - Late Chalcolithic 4
- Early Bronze I - c. 3000–2800 BC - burials only
- Achaemenid - Fifth century BC - burials only
- Hellenistic - Late fourth–second centuries BC - significant occupation
- Roman farmstead

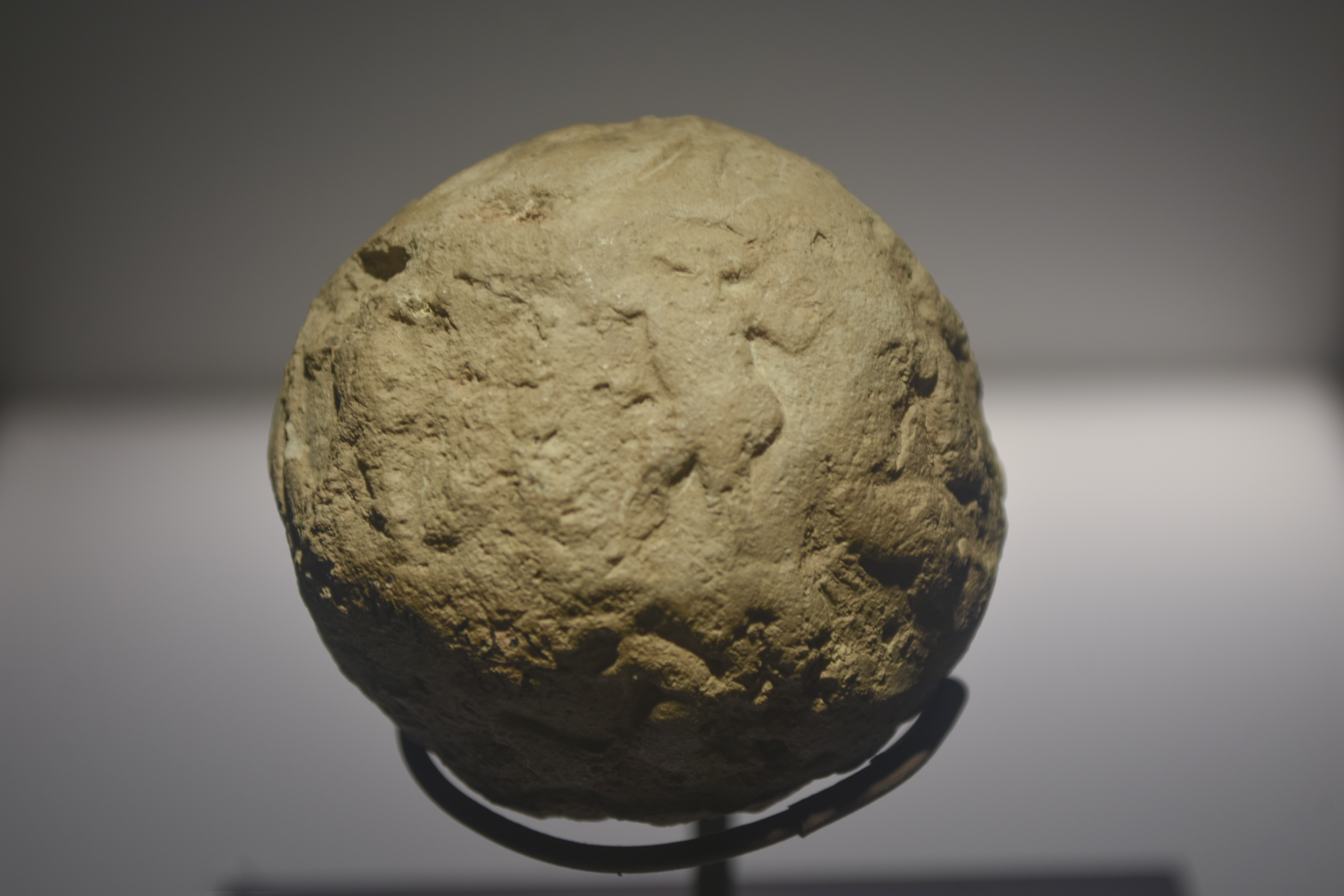
Uruk period sealed clay bulla

Unlike some "de novo" fortified sites in the Uruk Expansion like Jebel Aruda and Habuba Kabira, this Uruk presence emerged at an more distant existing local settlement, similarly to at Godin Tepe in Level V. It has been suggested that the Uruk population can be differentiated from the local population by the variance in food preparation methods.

Administrative activity was evident in all 4th millennium BC phases. In phase A, stamp seals and clay sealings were found which reflected those in the region at places like Değirmentepe. In phase B1 stamp seals and clay sealings reflected different imagery similar to sites like Tell Brak and Tepe Gawra. Finally, in phase B2 administrative practices of the Uruk culture, including the use of cylinder seals, emerges along with a return of regional seals similar to Phase A.

== See also ==
- Cities of the ancient Near East
- Chronology of the ancient Near East
- Tilbeş Höyük
- Proto-cuneiform
- Tell Qraya
