= Beveled rim bowl =

Mass produced clay bowls

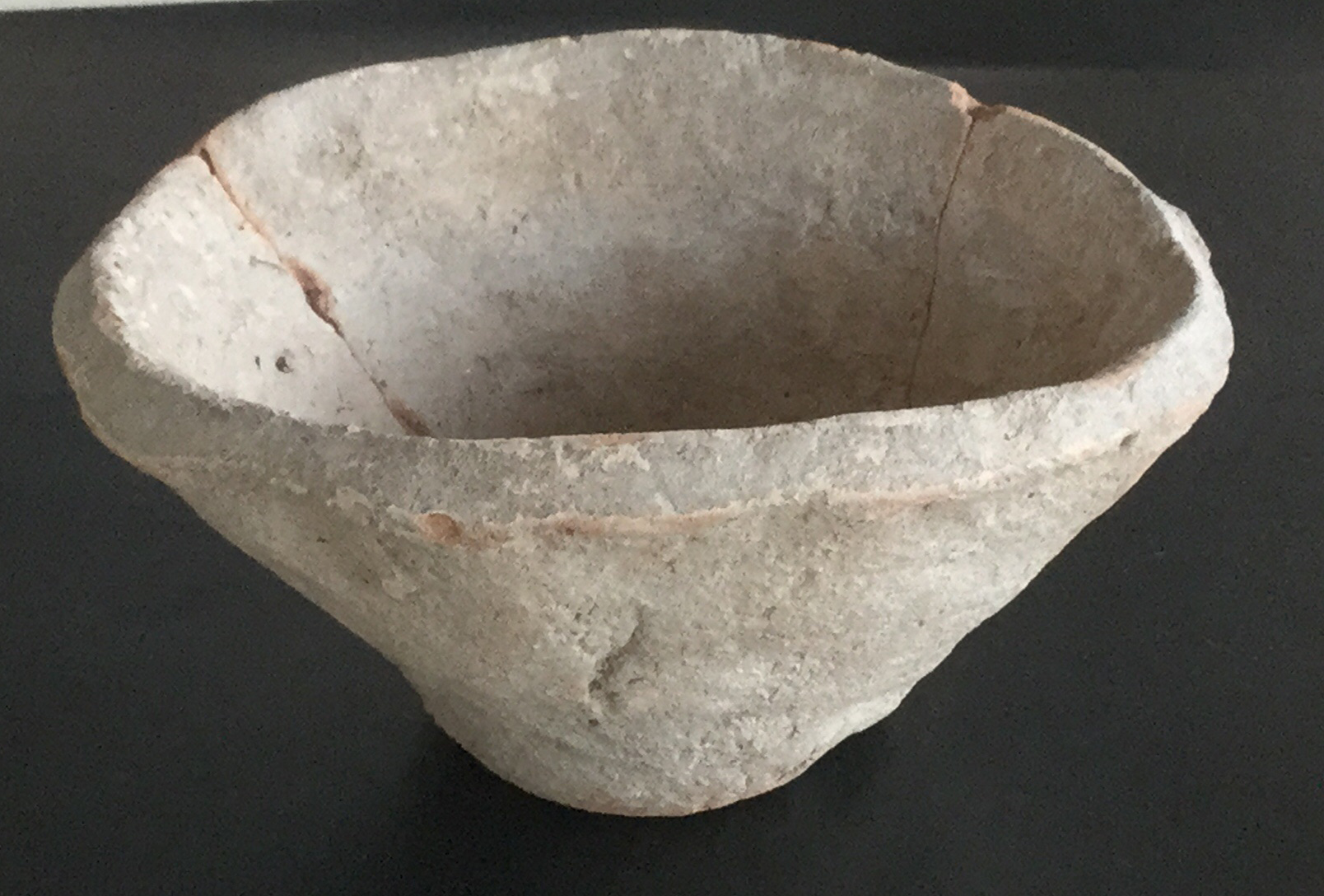
Uruk-period beveled rim bowl, c. 3400–3200 BCE, from Habuba Kabira South in Syria

Beveled rim bowls (traditionally called Glockentöpfe) are small, undecorated, mass-produced clay bowls most common in the 4th millennium BC during the Late Chalcolithic period. They constitute roughly three quarters of all ceramics found in Uruk culture sites, are therefore a unique and reliable indicator of the presence of the Uruk culture in ancient Mesopotamia.

Beveled rim bowls began to appear in the Early Uruk period (c. 3900-3600 BC) in Southern Mesopotamia with a few exemplars being found in Northern Mesopotamian sites like Tell Brak. They replaced the "wide flowerpots" (flat based, shallow, open bowls with a flared or conical profile) then common. They were common in the Middle Uruk period (c. 3600-3400 BC) throughout Mesopotamia and in some sites in Iran. In the Late Uruk period (c. 3400-3200 BC). In the subsequent Late Uruk and Jemdat Nasr periods (c. 3400-3100 BC) their use declined in Southern Mesopotamia and Iran along with a rise in numbers of the ceramics called "tall flowerpots" (Grosse Blumentopfe), which were of similar fabric as Beveled Rim Bowls but were wheel made, whose use is also still unclear. BRBs continued in use in Northern Mesopotamia in that period. Beveled rim bowls remained in use in a few sites in Syro-Anatolia during the Early Dynastic I period (c. 3100-2900 BC). Early on it was suggested that one of the signs of Proto-cuneiform, and perhaps a corresponding sign in Cuneiform (GAR/NINDA/AKALU), was derived from the bevelled rim bowl.

== Physical characteristics ==
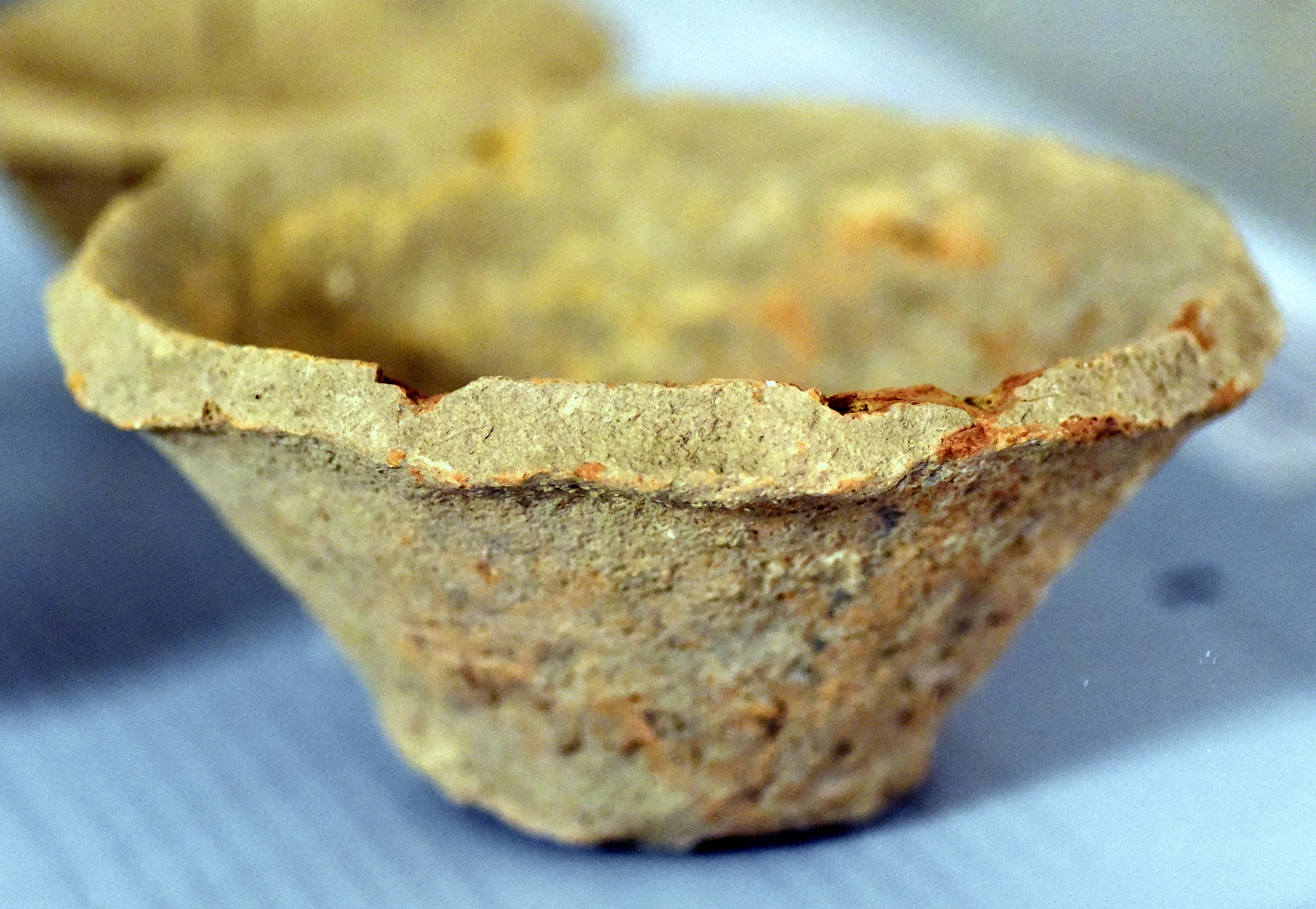
Beveled rim bowl from Logardan, northern Iraq. Uruk period, 4000-3100 BC. Sulaymaniyah Museum, Iraq

Beveled rim bowls are usually considered to be uniform in size standing roughly 10 cm (4 in) tall with the mouth of the bowl being approximately 18 cm (7.1 in) in diameter. There is in fact some variation in size. For example at the site of Chogha Mish beveled rim bowls were found with volumes from 385 to 2,580 milliliters, clustering at 700+/−200 milliliters. At Tepe Farukhabad BRB diameters ranged from 15 to 31 centimeters. Most BRBs hold 0.78–1.21 litres. The sides of the bowls have a straight steep angle down to a very defined base usually 9 cm (3.5 in) in diameter. The porous vegetable tempered bowls are made of low fired clay and have relatively thick walls compared to other forms of pottery of the time, making them surprisingly robust. They are also sometimes known as Chaff-Faced Ware.

The most unusual aspects of bevelled rim bowls are that they are undecorated and found discarded in large quantities. The exterior wall of the bowls is rough while the interior wall has been smoothed as well as has been the exterior rim. A thumb impression is often found in the bottom.

== Production ==
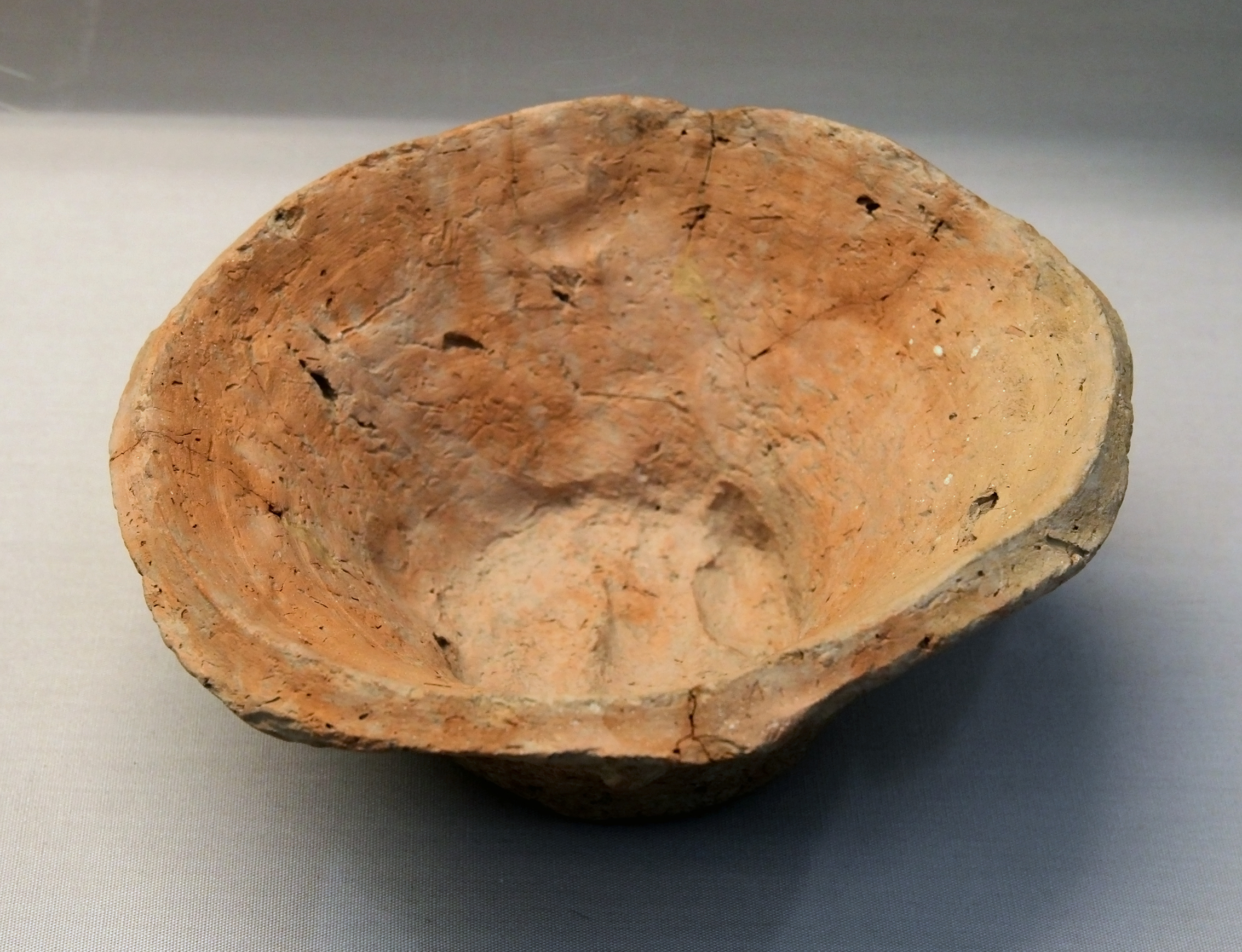
Beveled rim bowl. From Nineveh, Late Uruk Period, 3300-3100 BC. British Museum

While the exact method for production of beveled rim bowls is unknown, the most widely accepted theory is the use of a mold. A lesser accepted theory is that the bowls were made by hand. Archeologists replicating beveled rim bowls have found it considerably difficult to achieve the straight sides and well defined base while only using their hands. The use of a mold has been found to be a significant advantage when replicating the bowls. The large numbers of beveled rim bowls found (often in a single site) seem to support the mold theory because mass production with a mold is far more feasible than making them by hand. A debate exists among advocates of the mold theory. Most impose the use of a mobile mold that could be made of a variety of materials including wood, metal, stone or even another beveled rim bowl. Others suggest that craftsmen would have used a ground mold wherein the bowls were formed in a conical depression created in the ground.

== Use ==
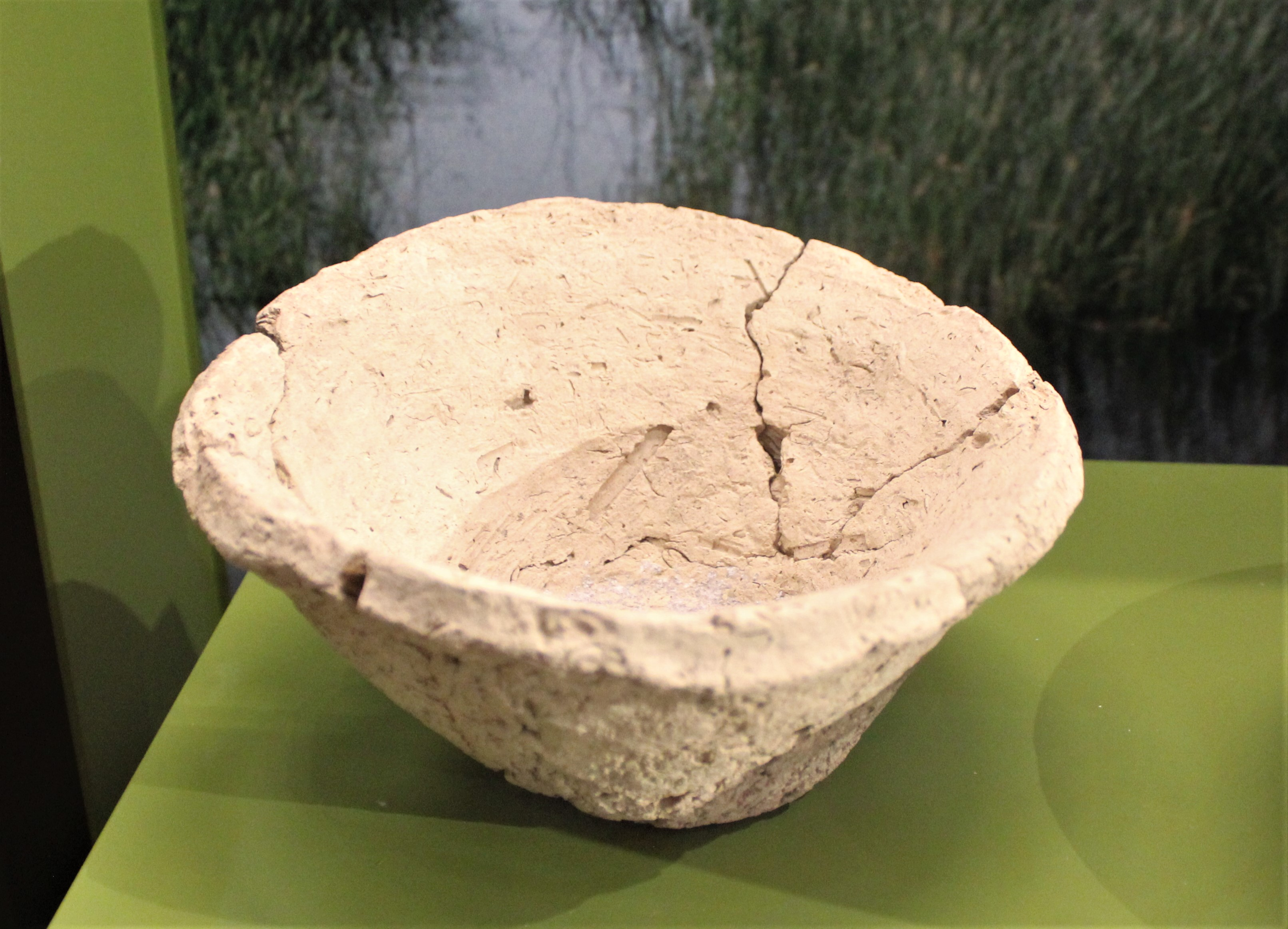
Beveled rim bowl from Kish.

Early on, largely based on finds at Uruk, bevelled rim bowls are widely thought to be used for measurement of grain rations (barley, spelt, or emmer wheat). The rations would be given as payment to laborers for services rendered as part of a Corvée labor system. It is also supported by the fact that the bowls are often found whole and in large piles as if they were disposable. The bowls would have been used for rationing once or twice and then discarded in a central location.The use of BRBs as ration bowls has been challenged. An alternate theory is that the bowls were used for baking bread, which also could have been rationed in its container. Early on, after many BRBs were found upside down, in the manner of Aramaic incantation bowls, it was suggested that they functioned as votive offerings. While the primary use of BRBs has not yet been fully settled, residue analysis has shown that they sometimes were used in other ways, likely in secondary (re-use) functions. BRBs found at Shakhi Kora were shown to have been used to hold meat, primarily from ruminants, and dairy products in what the researchers called a "meat stew".

== Distribution ==
Uruk expansion and colonial outposts, c. 3600-3100 BC

Beveled rim bowls originated in the city state of Uruk in the mid-fourth millennium BC. As the Uruk culture expanded so did the production and use of these bowls. The first bevelled rim bowls were discovered during excavations at Susa in 1897. Over time BRBs have been found throughout modern Iran: in the Zagros Mountains, Godin Tepe, Tall-e Malyan, Tapeh Tyalineh, Qaleh Naneh, and Chogha Gavaneh, in northern Iran Tepe Özbeki, Tepe Sialk, Tepe Sofalin, and Tepe Ghabristan, central Iran Tepe Yahiya, Tal-i-Iblis, Chogha Mish, Sarafabad, Tepe Farukhabad, Abu Fanduweh, Tepe Badamyar Rabat, and Tepe Musiyan, and southern Iran in Tol-e Nurabad, Tall-e Geser, and Mahtoutabad.

In Anatolia bevelled rim bowls were found at Arslantepe, Başur Höyük, Tilbeş Höyük, Hassek Höyük, Kurban Höyük, Samsat, and Tepecik.

In modern Syria they were found at Tell Humeida, Tell Sheikh Hassan, Hacınebi Tepe, Jebel Aruda, Habuba Kabira, Hamoukar, Jerablus Tahtani, Tell Brak, Tell er-Ramadi, and Tell Qraya near Terqa.

In modern Iraq BRBs have been found at Uruk, Girsu, Jemdet Nasr, Eridu, Gasur, Tell Mohammed ‘Arab, Abu Salabikh, Jemdet Zabi, Telul eth-Thalathat, Shakhi Kora, Tell al-Hawa, Tulul al-Baqarat, Tell Rubeidheh, Tell Uqair, Grai Resh, Kani Shaie, Girdi Qala and Logardan, Tell Begum, and Nineveh. Quantities were also found at Kish and Khafajah.

On the modern coast of Pakistan near the Gulf of Oman (Miri Qalat) which belonged to Kechi-Makran culture.

== See also ==
- Coba bowl
