= Grai Resh =

Archaeological site in Iraq

- Location within Iraq
- A: 36.31879414°N 41.91878375°E, B: 36.3179637°N 41.91893363°E
- Type: settlement
- Periods: Ubaid, Uruk
- Location: Nineveh Governorate, Iraq

History
- Built: 5th millennium BC

Site notes
- Excavation dates: 1938-1939, 2001-2002
- Archaeologists: Seton Lloyd, Christine Kepinski
- Condition: Ruined
- Owner: Public
- Public access: Yes

Grai Resh is an ancient Near East archaeological site in the Nineveh Governorate of northwestern Iraq just south of the Sinjar Mountains. It was first occupied at the beginning of the 5th millennium BC in the Ubaid period. It then became part of the Uruk Expansion. Beveled rim bowls, diagnostic of the Uruk Culture, were found at the site. Grai Resh may have been occupied as late as the Jemdat Nasr or Early Dynastic I period before being abandoned. It has been suggested that site may have been, in the early 2nd millennium BC, the location of small Amorite kingdom of Kurda. Finds showed that the site participated in widespread trade.

== Archaeology ==
The site was first noted, as Grai Reš, in 1938 by Seton Lloyd during a survey of the Sinjar region. It was said to be primarily from the Uruk period based on surface pottery, including Beveled rim bowls. Excavation was conducted in 1939 by Lloyd on behalf of the Department of Antiquities of the Government of Iraq. The site was reported as being 200 meters by 300 meters with a swift flowing stream running along the eastern edge and an overall area of about 6 hectares. A modern road from Tell Afar to Balad Sinjar divided the site in half with the southern portion rising 12 meters above the plain and the northern portion 20 meters. Remnants of a mudbrick structure destroyed by fire is visible in the cut. A 20-meter square was excavated just south of the road (Area AB) followed by a 30 meter long and 4 meter wide trench (Trench C) running east of the square. Nine building levels were determined, in Area AB - Levels I-III and in Trench C Levels IV-IX. The primary focus of the work was on a private house in Level II.

- Level I - Small building. Ninevite V period pottery. Possibly Early Dynastic.
- Level II - Well built private home. Greyware pottery. Possibly Jemdat Nasr
- Levels III-V - Private home destroyed by fire. Uruk period pottery. Excavation found a 5 meter wide wall thought to be a defensive wall or fortification. Levels IV - V showed transition from Ubaid pottery
- Levels VI-IX - Ubaid period. Painted pottery.

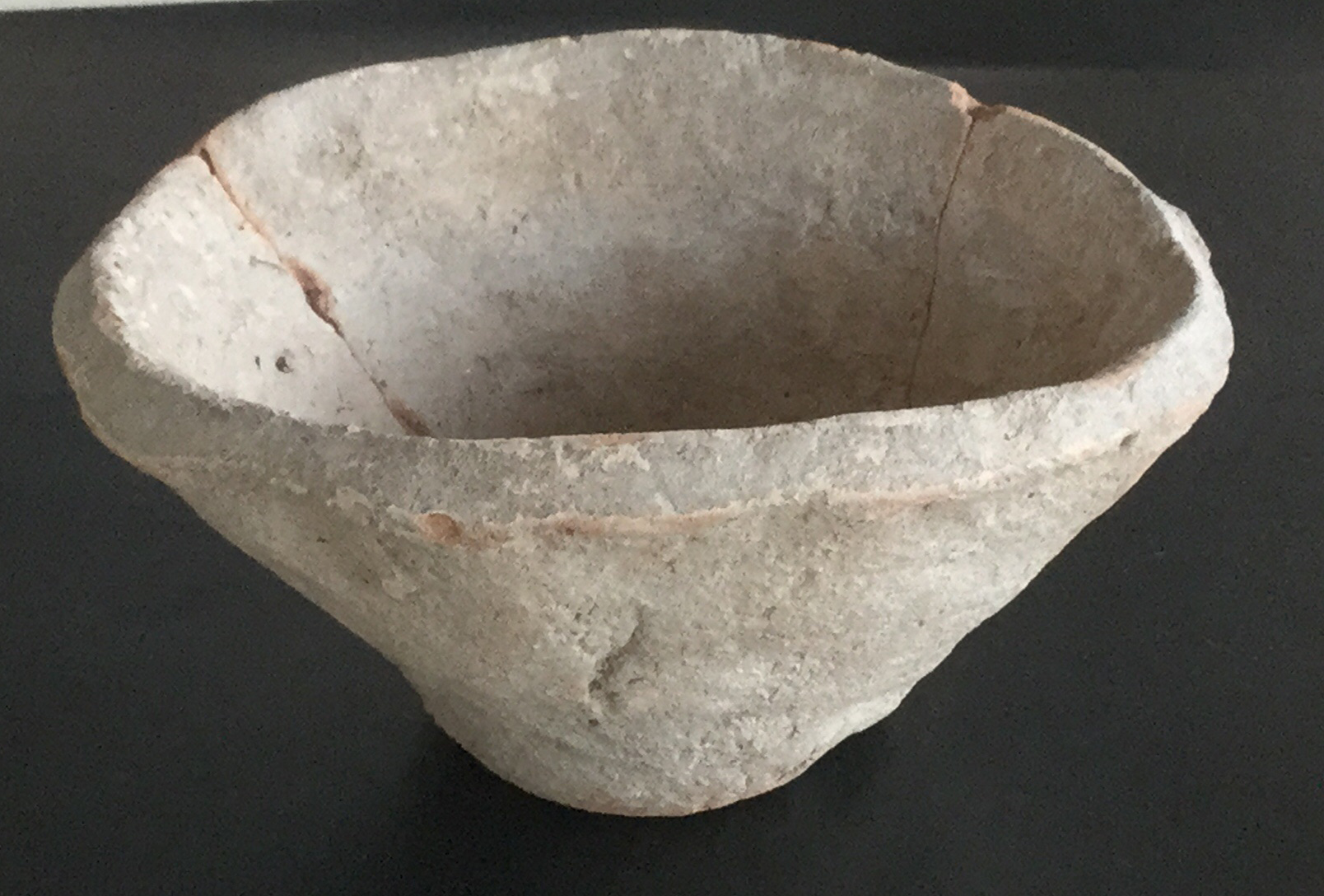
Uruk period beveled rim bowl

The Level II private home, of large rectangular mudbricks, was roughly 12 meters by 8 meters holding a long central room with white painted walls, several side rooms, and an entrance way. A large storage jar contained wheat and barley carbonized by the fire and others the remains of meat. There was evidence of small scale lithic manufacturing in flint and obsidian producing mainly sickle blades. Small finds included the horns of a water buffalo, baked clay animals, figurines, spindle whorls, and sling pellets, purple marble macehead, copper drill bit, and beads of stone clay and obsidian. A stamp seal and one sealing were also found.

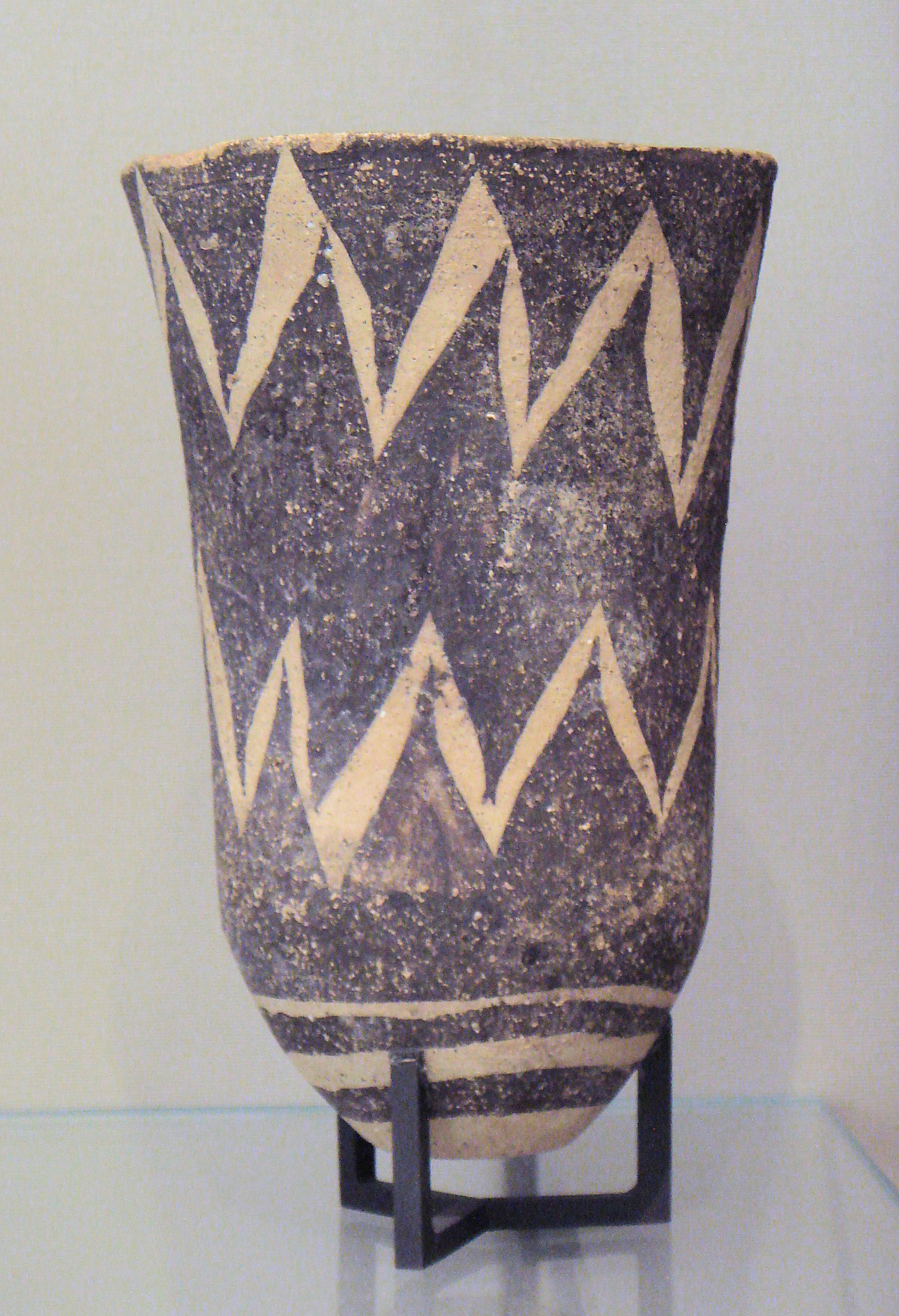
Ubaid IV pottery 4700-4200 BC Tello, ancient Girsu. Louvre Museum

In 2001 a French team led by Christine Kepinski conducted a topographic survey of the site. A large number of surface pottery shards showed that the site actually extended out to an area of about 32 hectares. In many places that area is occupied by modern farms and in others the soil has been removed for agricultural projects. A new road now passes across the south and the old road through the mound has gone out of use though farmers have been removing soil and archaeological remains from that area to enrich their fields. There was no surface collection due to the crops being high at that season but in disturbed spots abundant 4th and 5th millennium BC shards were noted. A significant amount of 2nd millennium BC shards were also seen prompting speculation that Grai Rash was the location of the small Amorite kingdom of Kurda.

In 2002 an excavation season was conducted. Work occurred in the old road cut area that was examined by the 1939 excavation (Area AB) and along the new road in the south. In area A, in extending the early work, a mudbrick burial vault was found on Level IV. It contained the remains of a child with 19 beads around the wrist (16 carnelian, 2 lapis lazuli, 1 gold). In area B enough soil had been removed by bulldozers that it was not possible to identify the 1939 excavation. Six 10 meter by 10 meter trenches were opened there. At this point they subdivided Level II into IIA and IIB. On Level IIA A tripartite building and a terracotta eye-idol were found. On Level IB they found several tripartite buildings. In one was a bead workshop with hundreds of calcite, bone, obsidian and shell beads, a black stone seal with geometric design, and an amulet in the shape of a human head in profile were found. A number of ovens were found in and associated with buildings and some of buildings contained, spindle whorls, Canaanite blades and other flint and obsidian tools, and possible sling bullets. A few possible clay tokens rested on floors. Subsequent work at the site was curtailed due to the 2003 war in Iraq.

== History ==
Uruk expansion and colonial outposts

The first excavator of Grai Resh in 1939 dated the beginning of occupation to the Ubaid period (Levels VI-IX) followed by the Uruk period including Early, Middle, and Late (Levels III-V), Jemdat Nasr period (Level II), and Early Dynastic I period (Level I) early in the 3rd millennium BC before the site was abandoned. The large enclosure wall was dated to the Uruk period. Since then the absolute dating of the Ubaid and Uruk periods have been subject to much change and controversy.

In general, the most recent excavators in 2002 proposed an earlier chronology with the large enclosure wall dating to the end of the Late Chalcolithic 2 5th millennium BC Ubaid period and with the site being abandoned by 3600 BC at the end of the Late Chalcolithic 3 period, reflecting the divergences in view on the chronology of the Uruk Period. Coba bowl, a Late Chacolithic 2 Ubaid period pottery proposed as the predecessor of beveled rim bowls. were found at the site.

In 1963 two samples taken in 1955, one from each mound taken from the surface of the road cut, were radiocarbon dated to 5169 ±64 CYBP or 3219 BC and 4939 ±75 CYBP or 2989 BC. In 2002 six samples were taken for radiocarbon dating (OxCal 4.1.7 - calibration curve: IntCal09). Three samples were from Level IIB and two from Level IV (all Area AB) and one from an oven on Level IIA (Area B). From these the excavators developed a chronology of Level IV (4250–4150 BC), Level III (4150–4050 BC) and Level IIB (4050–3850 BC), and Level IIA (3850–3600 BC).

== Shakhi Kora ==
Shakhi Kora is a Late Chalcolithic (LC) ancient Near East archaeological site in lower Sirwan/ upper Diyala river valley of north-east Iraq, 10 kilometers to the south-west of the modern town of Kalar in the Sulaymaniyah Governorate. Aside from stray LC1 shards the site was determined to be occupied between LC2 (Early Uruk) and LC5 (Late Uruk) with some minor occupation in the following Jemdet Nasr period . At its peak it reached an area of about 8 hectares. After a sounding in 2018 prompted by reports of looting at the site it was excavated in 2019, 2022, and 2023 by a team from the University of Glasgow led by Claudia Glatz as part of the Sirwan Regional Project. To date 728 square meters have been excavated and six occupational layers determined. A magnetic gradiometer survey was also conducted which showed the presence of several large buildings. Large numbers of coarseware bevelled rim bowls (Glockentöpfe) as well as "wide flower pots" (Grober Blumentopf) were found in a context radiocarbon dated to c. 3780-3377 BC. Organic residue analysis of some of the bowls showed they were used for meat (and possibly dairy) based stews, often flavored with tree resin from the Pinaceae (pine) family. The residues were also found on some fineware bowks. Faunal remains at the site were primarily sheep and goats with a few cattle.

== See also ==
- Cities of the ancient Near East
- Chronology of the ancient Near East
- Jebel Aruda
- Tell al-Hawa
