= Shahdad (archaeological site) =

Archaeological site in Iran

- Location within Iran
- 30°26′07″N 57°45′12″E
- Type: settlement
- Periods: Late Chalcolithic, Bronze Age
- Location: Kerman Province, Iran

History
- Built: 5th millennium BC

Site notes
- Excavation dates: 1969-1974, 1977, 1978, 1991-1995, 2016
- Archaeologists: Ali Hakemi, M.E. Bayani, Sandro Salvatori, Massimo Vidale, Mir Abedin Kaboli, Nasir Eskandari
- Condition: Ruined
- Owner: Public
- Public access: Yes

The Shahdad ancient Near East archeological site lies in the north-western edge of the Lut Desert of Kerman Province of southeastern Iran roughly 65 kilometers east of modern Kerman. Initially called "Chale Takab" it has come to be generally known as Shahdad due to the proximity, about five kilometers to the west, of the modern town of Shahdad. Begun on a small scale in the 5th millennium BC the site was primarily occupied in the 3rd millennium BC, Early Bronze Age, and included a large cemetery from the second half of the 3rd millennium BC. Some occupation at the site continued into the early 2nd millennium BC. A single pottery sherd excavated from Shahdad in 1971 had what is thought to be a 6 sign Linear Elamite inscription. The site was a major center of metal extraction and processing in the 3rd millennium BC over a peripheral area covering about 9 square kilometers. A single hollow clay envelope containing clay tokens was found at the site. It has been suggested that the Mesopotamian water god Enki was worshiped at the site. Early on it was suggested that Shahdad was the location of 3rd millennium BC city of Šimaški.

Two other sites on the Shahdad Plain, Tepe Dehno and Tepe East Dehno, have also been excavated.

== Archaeology ==
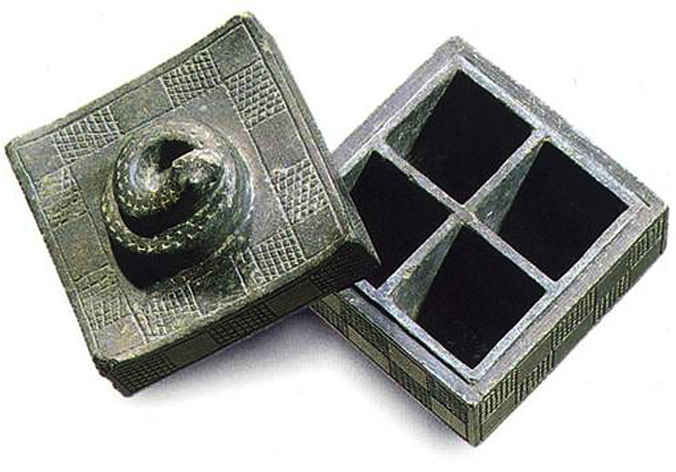
Serpent on a jewelry box from Shahdad, Iran, 2700 BC

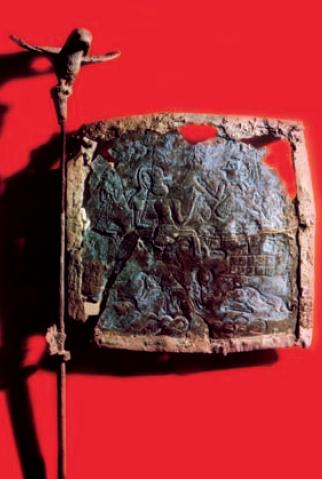
Shahdad bronze flag

The site was first noticed due to erosion revealing graves. It was excavated from 1669 until 1974 by a team led by Ali Hakemi of the Archaeological Service of Iran. One main 100 meters by 50 meters trench (Trench A) and five smaller trenches were opened. This work focused on the graveyard (made up of Cemetery A and Cemetery B), clearing 383 graves, one a chamber tomb with painted walls. Finds, in the cemeteries, included a number of near life sized painted clay statues and over 200 chlorite (soapstone) objects as well as 348 potter's marks on vessels. One important find was the "Standard of Shahdad", a square metal plague. Though a number of cylinder seals ("silver and stone with human, vegetal and animal motifs") and stamp seals were found there were no actual clay sealings at the site. A grave (Grave 30), mudbrick and oriented east/west, excavated from Cemetery A produced a vessel containing "white cosmetic preparation" having a radiocarbon date (calibration method - INTCAL20) of 2923–2667 BC. This is in a portion of the calibration curve considered "unfavorable". Other grave goods included copper/bronze vessels and a copper/bronze pin. One of the jars in the gave had a short (6 signs) possible Linear Elamite inscription. A similar sample in Grave 338, also mudbrick and oriented east/west, produced a more reasonable radiocarbon date of 2500–2300 BC (INTCAL20). Grave goods included a necklace of lapis lazuli, agate, white stone, and copper beads. Metal finds included 10 axes with chased designs, and long pins with geometric designs.

A brief surface survey was conducted in 1977. During the survey a 300 foot by 300 foot hill covered with copper smelting debris. Copper being produced contained a small amount of arsenic to strengthen it. A group of 5 mudbrick buildings (site D) was identified in this survey and excavated by A. Hakemi and M.E. Bayani in 1978. It was considered by the excavators to be a metallurgical workshop that had been destroyed in a catastrophic flood. Elaborate ovens found in them were deemed copper-processing furnaces by the excavators. A much later analysis indicated those ovens were actually domestic fireplaces.

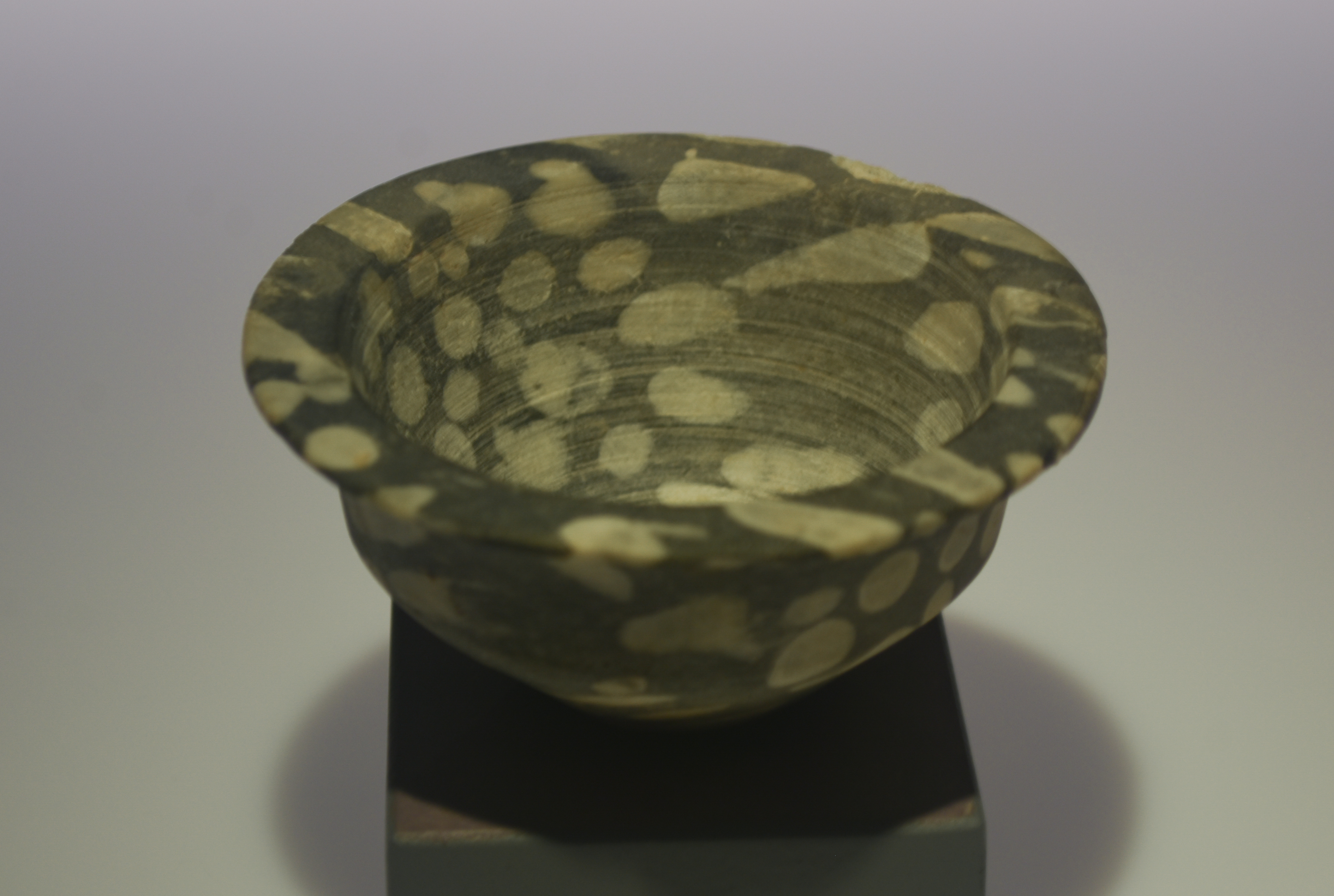
Bronze Age stone bowl. Ca. 2600-2400 BC. Provenance: Cemetery A tomb 263, in Shahdad, Iran

Excavations were conducted by Mir Abedin Kaboli in four seasons from 1991 until 1995. Work focused on residential areas as well as a "Jewelry area" with "agate and carnelian flakes dumps, with hundreds of unfinished bead and flint drill-heads". A 1970 Corona satellite image taken in 1970 and a 1993 aerial photograph were used to determine the extent and delineation of the site.

In January 2009 dark green-grey chlorite cylindrical vessel (15.5 centimeters long and 3.6 centimeters wide) dated to the middle of the 3rd millennium BC was found on the surface at the site. The vessel had traces of a lead carbonate based cosmetic.

In 2016 a team of archaeologists with a topographer, led by Nasir Eskandari, did a 2 week walking surface survey of the site which produced a new high resolution topographic map. Thirty test trenches were excavated on the peripheries of areas identified in the surface survey. Results indicated that the 170 hectare occupation area was actually made up of 18 settled areas separated by unsettled spaces forming a distributed occupation.

== History ==
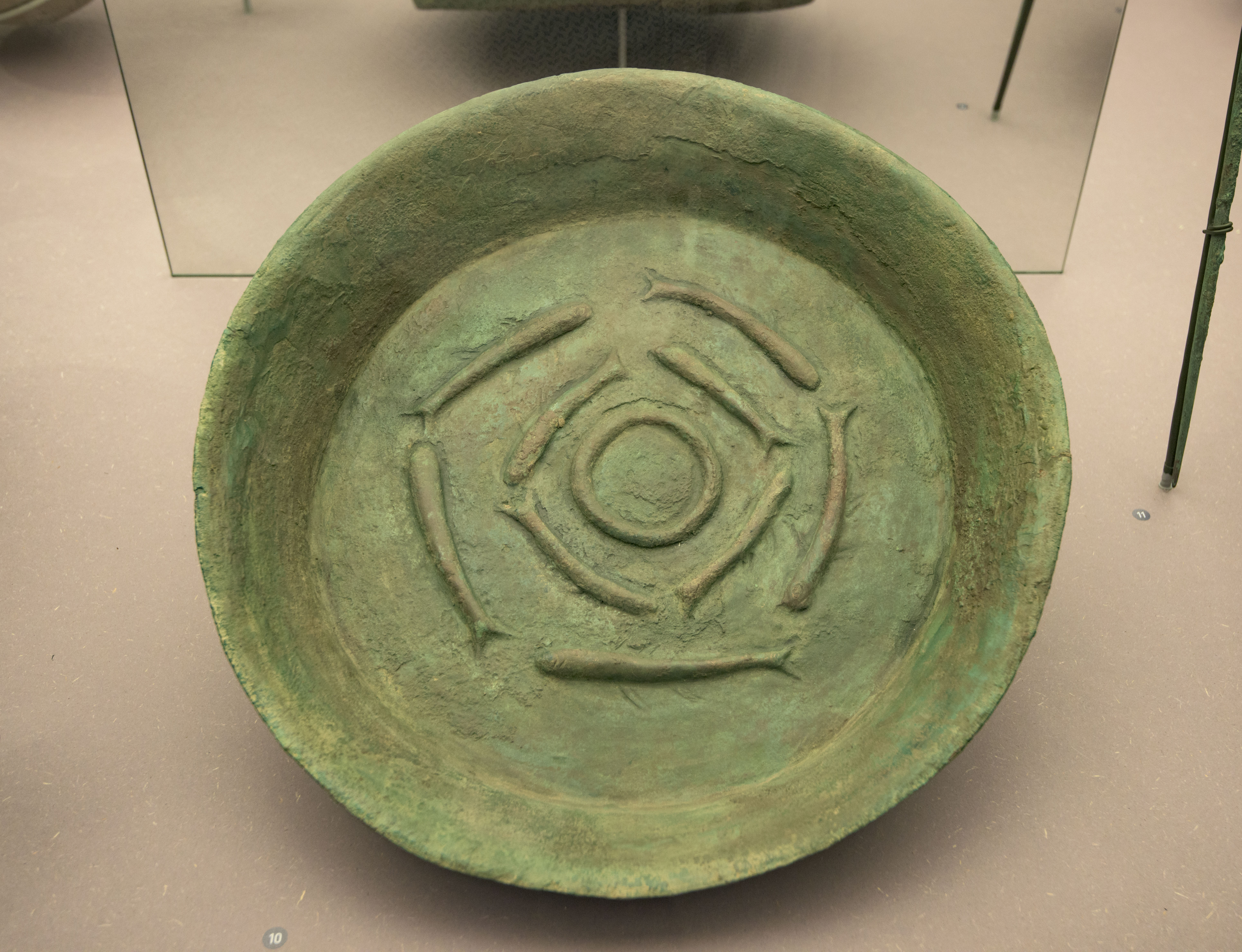
Shahdad ware bronze fish

First occupied on a small scale in the 5th millennium BC with a small mound then at a small mound further westward in the 4th millennium BC. The site was primarily occupied in the later half of the 3rd millennium BC (between 2500 and c. 1900 BC) further to the west and included a large cemetery from that period. In that period it reached its maximum area of 80 to 100 hectares.

=== Early and Middle Bronze Age ===
Based largely on pottery but also due to mistaking the Linear Elamite (late 3rd millennium BC) inscription as being Proto-Elamite (early 3rd millennium BC) the first excavator proposed a phasing of cultural periods and subperiods, a chronology which is now largely discounted.

- TAK IV2 - 3300–2700 BC, TAK IV1 - 2700–2500 BC
- TAK III2 - 2500–2200 BC, TAK III1 - 2200–1900 BC
- TAK II2 - 1900–1700 BC, TAK II1 - 1700–1500 BC
- TAK I - 1500 BC–?

Current thinking places the stratigraphy of the site somewhat later.

- Surface Data - Aliabad Culture (3800-3300 BC)
- Eastern Cemetery - 2300-2000 BC
- Cemetery A - 2500-2000 BC
- Cemetery B - 2000-1800 BC
- Cemetery C - 1800-1600? BC
- Area D - 2nd half of 3rd millennium BC

=== Late Bronze Age and later ===
After some modest occupation in the 2nd millennium BC the settlement was then abandoned. There is surface evidence of an Islamic period settlement and a small oasis village currently exists.

== See also ==
- Chronology of the ancient Near East
- Cities of the ancient Near East
- Tal-i-Iblis
- Tepe Sialk
- Tepe Yahya
