= Sadegh Malek Shahmirzadi =

Iranian archaeologist and anthropologist (1940–2020)

- Born: 24 April 1940; Shahmirzad, Semnan province, Imperial Iran
- Died: 12 October 2020 (aged 80); Tehran, Iran
- Other name: Shapur
- Occupations: Anthropologist; Archaeologist

Sadegh Malek Shahmirzadi (Persian: صادق ملک شهميرزادی, 24 April 1940 – 12 October 2020) was an Iranian archaeologist and anthropologist.

== Career ==
Shahmirzadi is the author of over 60 research articles and books. Shahmirzadi's book, Dictionary of Archeology English-Persian-Persian-English, published in 1997, is still in print.

Tepe Sialk is reportedly one of the most important prehistoric excavations in Iran, and a team of Iranian archaeologists led by Shahmirzadi launched the Sialk Reconsideration Project in 1999. Tepe Sialk had been excavated by a team headed by Roman Ghirshman and his wife Tania Ghirshman for three seasons (1933, 1934, and 1937) before Shahmirzadi.

In 2004, the Iranian Cultural Heritage News Agency reported that, "Iranian archeologists planned to identify the food basket and diet of the people who lived in the historical site of Sialk over 7,000 years ago," and "Shahmirzadi, discoverer of the ziggurat, [was] head of the research team."

Speaking at the Bolaghi Gorge (Tangeh Bolāghi) Seminar held on 20 January 2007 in Tehran, Shahmirzadi said:

Until some 40 years ago, people did not show much interest toward archeological sites and the issue of cultural heritage was somehow unknown but today we are witnessing such a large gathering with the presence of a large number of experts and NGOs who show great concern for preserving cultural heritage of Iran and their heart is beating for Bolaghi Gorge as a historical and national heritage site.

The ... inundation of Sivand Dam ... issue evoked strong opposition from cultural heritage enthusiasts and NGOs who are concerned with the fate of the historic site of Bolaghi Gorge, demanding Iranian authorities prevent flooding of the Dam. The majority of those who attended at the conference and also most of archeologists who work on Bolaghi Gorge categorically protested against flooding of Sivand Dam, accompanied by placards to show their objections to inundation of the Dam.

Dr. Michael D. Danti of Boston University's Department of Archaeology thanked "Sadegh Malek Shahmirzadi for involving me in his research project at Tepe Sialk."

== Bibliography (partial list) ==
- 1978, Introduction to Sociology (in Persian)
- 1994, Fundamental of Archaeology, Prehistoric Iran, Prehistoric Mesopotamia and Art and Archeology of Ancient Egypt (in Persian)
- 1996, English for Student of Archeology
- 1996, Dictionary of Archaeology English-Persian-Persian-English (ISBN 964-01-0844-8)
- 1996, Iranian Houses
- 1998, History of Early Iran (in Persian); co-authors with Dr. M. Haririan, Dr. J. Amoozgar, and N. Mirsaidi. (Fifth printing 2006)
- 1999, Prehistoric Iran; Iran From The Earliest Times to the Dawn of Urbanism
- 2000, Agh Tepe; co-author with Jebraeil Nokandeh
- 2004, The Silversmiths of Sialk (in Persian) (ISBN 9647483872)
- 2006, Sialk, The Oldest Fortified Village of Iran; Iranian Center for Archaeological Research, Tehran, Iran
