= Berlin workshops on Babylonian mathematics =

The Berlin workshops were a series of six workshops that took place between 1983 and 1994 and focused on mathematical conceptualization and notation in a number of early writing systems. Although the names of the workshops varied slightly over time, most included the phase "conceptual development of Babylonian mathematics" and were supported by the Archaische Texte aus Uruk Project at Freie Universität Berlin and the Max Planck Institute for the History of Science. The first meeting was held at the Altorientalisches Seminar und Seminar für Vorderasiatische Altertumskunde on August 5, 1983. Subsequent meetings were held in 1984, 1985, 1988 and 1994.

== List of workshops ==
The workshops played a significant role in advancing the decipherment of Proto-cuneiform and Proto-Elamite numerals as well as the comparative study of early mathematical notation.

- Workshop on Mathematical Concepts in Babylonian Mathematics Date: August 1–5, 1983. Place: Seminar für Vorderasiatische Altertumskunde und altorientalische Philologie der Freien Universität.
- Second Workshop on Concept Development in Babylonian Mathematics Date: June 18–22, 1984. Place: Seminar für Vorderasiatische Altertumskunde der Freien Universität Berlin.
- Third Workshop on Concept Development in Babylonian Mathematics Date: December 9–13, 1985. Place: Seminar für Vorderasiatische Altertumskunde der Freien Universität Berlin.
- Fourth Workshop on Concept Development in Babylonian Mathematics Date: May 5–9, 1988. Place: Seminar für Vorderasiatische Altertumskunde der Freien Universität Berlin.
- Fifth Workshop on Mathematical Concepts in Babylonian Mathematics Date: January 21–23, 1994. Place: Seminar für Vorderasiatische Altertumskunde der Freien Universität Berlin.
- Standardisierung der elektronischen Transliteration von Keilschrifttexten Date: September 7–9, 1994. Place: Max Planck Institute for the History of Science
