= Tepe Yahya =

Bronze Age archaeological site in Iran

- Location within Iran
- 28°19′51″N 56°52′03″E
- Type: settlement
- Periods: Bronze Age
- Cultures: Proto-Elamite, Jiroft culture, Sasanian Empire
- Location: Kermān Province, Iran

History
- Built: 4th–3rd millennium BC

Site notes
- Excavation dates: 1968–1971, 1973, 1975
- Archaeologists: C. C. Lamberg-Karlovsky
- Condition: Ruined
- Owner: Public
- Public access: Yes

Tepe Yahya (Persian: تپه یحیی) is a Bronze Age archaeological site in southeastern Iran. It is in the easternmost area of the Proto-Elamite culture. Excavations at Tepe Yahya show evidence of very early clay tablet usage and writing, early metallurgy, and the manufacture of stoneware for wide distribution. The site is a circular mound—the tell or tepe—around 20 meters high and 187 meters in diameter.

Tepe Yahya is 1 km from a much larger site which was occupied in 3rd millennium BCE. It is in Kermān Province, some 220 kilometres (140 mi) south of Kerman, 90 kilometres (56 mi) south of Baft and 90 km south-west of Jiroft.

== History ==
Tepe Yahya was occupied from the 6th to 2nd millennia BC and the 10th to 4th centuries BC. In the middle of the 2nd millennium BC, the city was a production center of chlorite stone ware; these carved dark stone vessels have been found in ancient Mesopotamian temples.

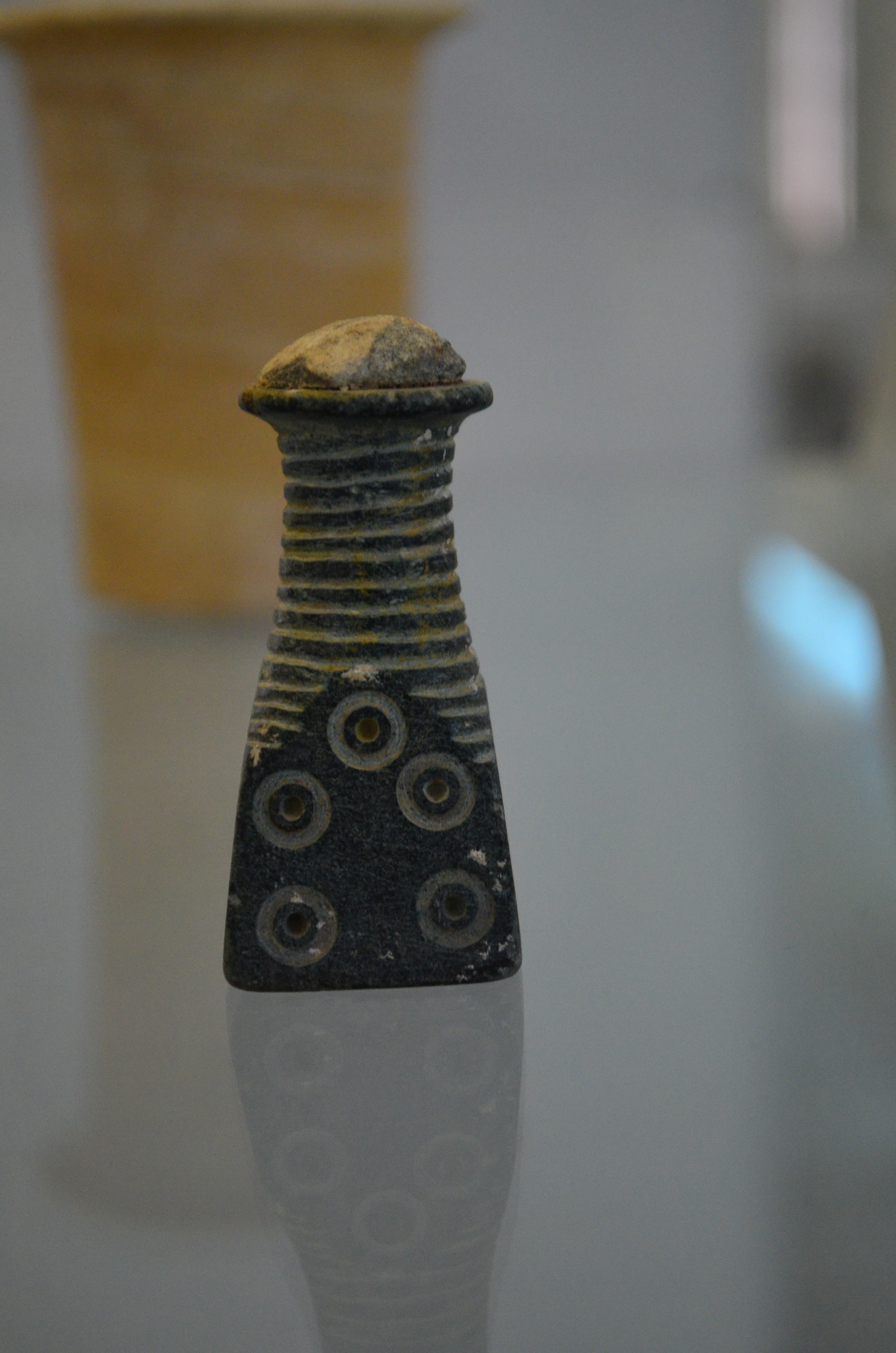
Chlorite vessel from Kerman Province, Iran. 3rd millennium BC - National Museum of Iran

== Excavations and periodization ==
Tepe Yahya was excavated in six seasons (1968–1971, 1973, 1975) by the American School of Prehistoric Research of the Peabody Museum of Archaeology and Ethnology of Harvard University in a joint operation with what is now the Shiraz University under the direction of C. C. Lamberg-Karlovsky. Jane Britton was one of the excavators on the dig in 1968.

=== Periodization ===
Periodization is as follows, starting with the most recent:

- I (Sasanian/Parthian): 200 BC – 225 AD
- II (Achaemenian/Hellenistic): 275–475 BC
- III (Iron Age: 525–700 BC
- (Abandoned)
- IV A (Shahdad/Kaftar)i: late 3rd to early 2nd millennium BC
- IV B (Jiroft culture/Halirud style): 2nd half of 3rd millennium BC
- (Abandoned)
- IV C (Proto-Elamite): c. 3000 BC
- (Abandoned)
- V (Yahya Culture): 3400–3800 BC
- VI (Coarse Ware-Neolithic): 3800–4500 BC
- VII (Neolithic) 4500–5500 BC

== Findings ==
The Neolithic period VII strata of Tepe Yahya yielded an extremely detailed green soapstone female figurine of a phallic shape. It featured eight individually drilled orifices. An associated charcoal sample was submitted for radiocarbon dating.

In the late 4th millennium BC IVC Proto-Elamite period (comparable with levels 14–16 at Susa), a monumental building covered the top of the Tepe Yahya mound. The design was similar to other Proto-Elamite sites and to the Uruk site at Habuba Kabira in Syria. It was constructed with a standardized 48 x 24 x 8 centimeter brick used throughout the complex. The buildings were designed and constructed from the outside-in using a base measure of 72 cm, approximating the "large cubit" measure used throughout the ancient Near East. It was occupied for less than a century.

Over 1,000 steatite pieces from to Period IVB were found, an indication of local manufacturing at Tepe Yahya. A steatite mine was discovered near the site. The steatite vessels have been discovered across a wide geographic range. In addition to Mesopotamia, they have been recovered in Bampur and Shahr-e Sukhteh in the modern Iranian province of Sistan and Baluchestan. They were also found in the lower levels at Mohenjodaro in India. Steatite bowls with similar motifs are also found on Tarout Island off the Arabian Peninsula, and copies have been found at Umm-an Nar in the Persian Gulf.

Two Iron Age platforms from the Achaemenid period were also discovered.

=== Metallurgy ===
Tepe Yahya was a site of early metallurgy. Four metal artifacts were found at the site: a copper shaft-hole axe from layer IVB5; a copper/lead theriomorphic figurine from IVB; a copper spearhead from IVC2; and a metal vessel containing jarosite along with two large biconical heulandite beads, and an alabaster vessel from IVC2. The 10.6% lead content of the figurine shows that it was actually from the Late Uruk period.

Early metallurgy has also been attested at the related Tal-i-Iblis site in Kerman province.

=== Writing ===
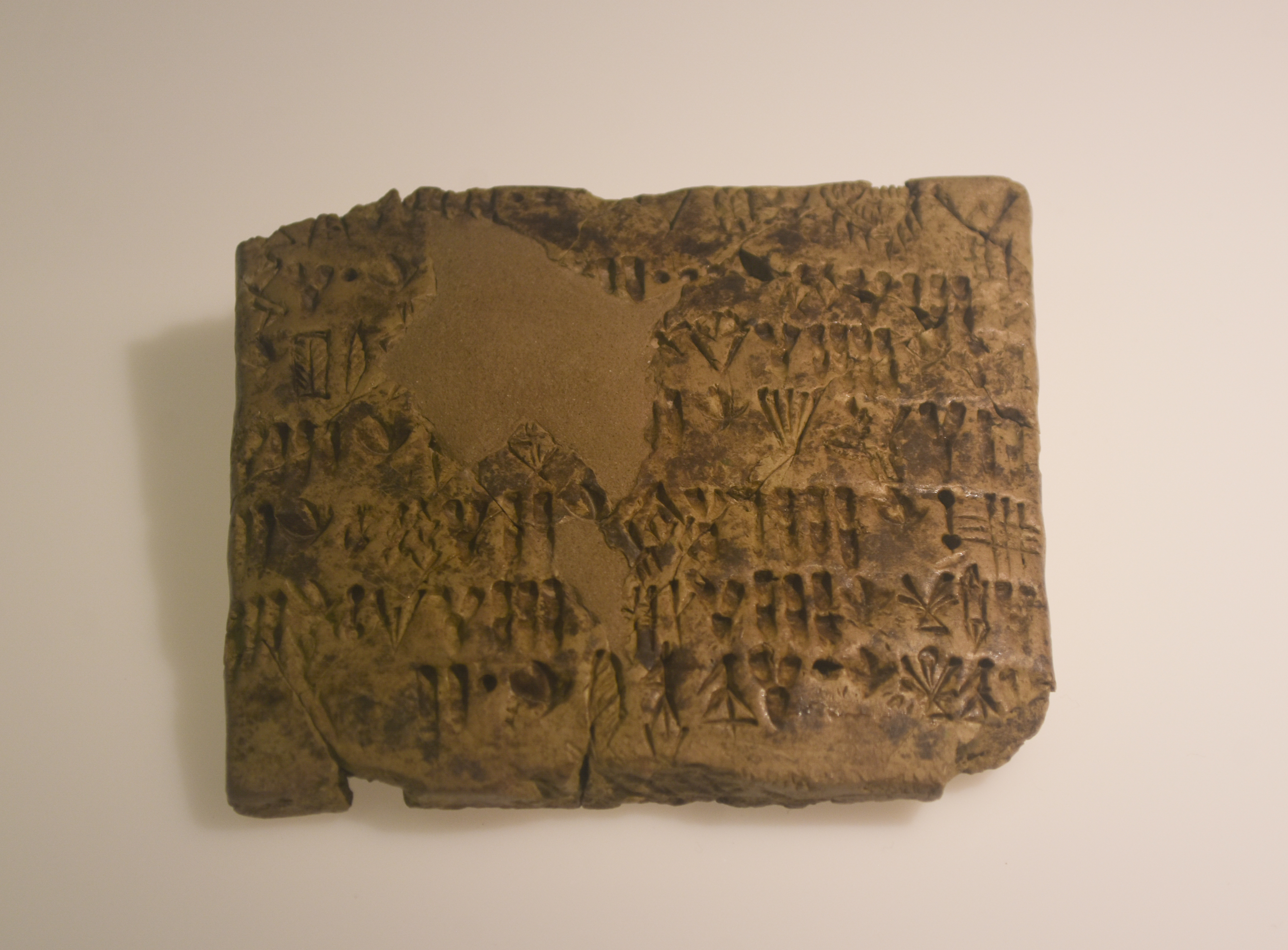
Proto-Elamite tablet found at Tepe Yahya

Tepe Yahya yielded the oldest recovered clay tablets with Proto-Elamite script Three tablets from the IVC strata were radiocarbon dated, yielding dates of 2955 BC, 2790 BC, and 3490 BC.

The findings of 84 clay tablet blanks indicate that writing was being practiced at Tepe Yahya. These finds are similar to the discoveries at Susa and Tepe Sialk.

There were 27 used tablets from Period IVC recovered; 21 of these record grain quantities, mostly for rations. Several cylinder seals and a number of cylinder sealings were found on this level, as well as beveled rim bowls.

== See also ==
- Cities of the Ancient Near East
- Konar Sandal
- Shahr-e Sukhteh
- Jiroft culture
- Tepe Sofalin
