= Proto-Elamite (period) =

Historical period of Iranian civilization (c. 3200–2700 BCE)

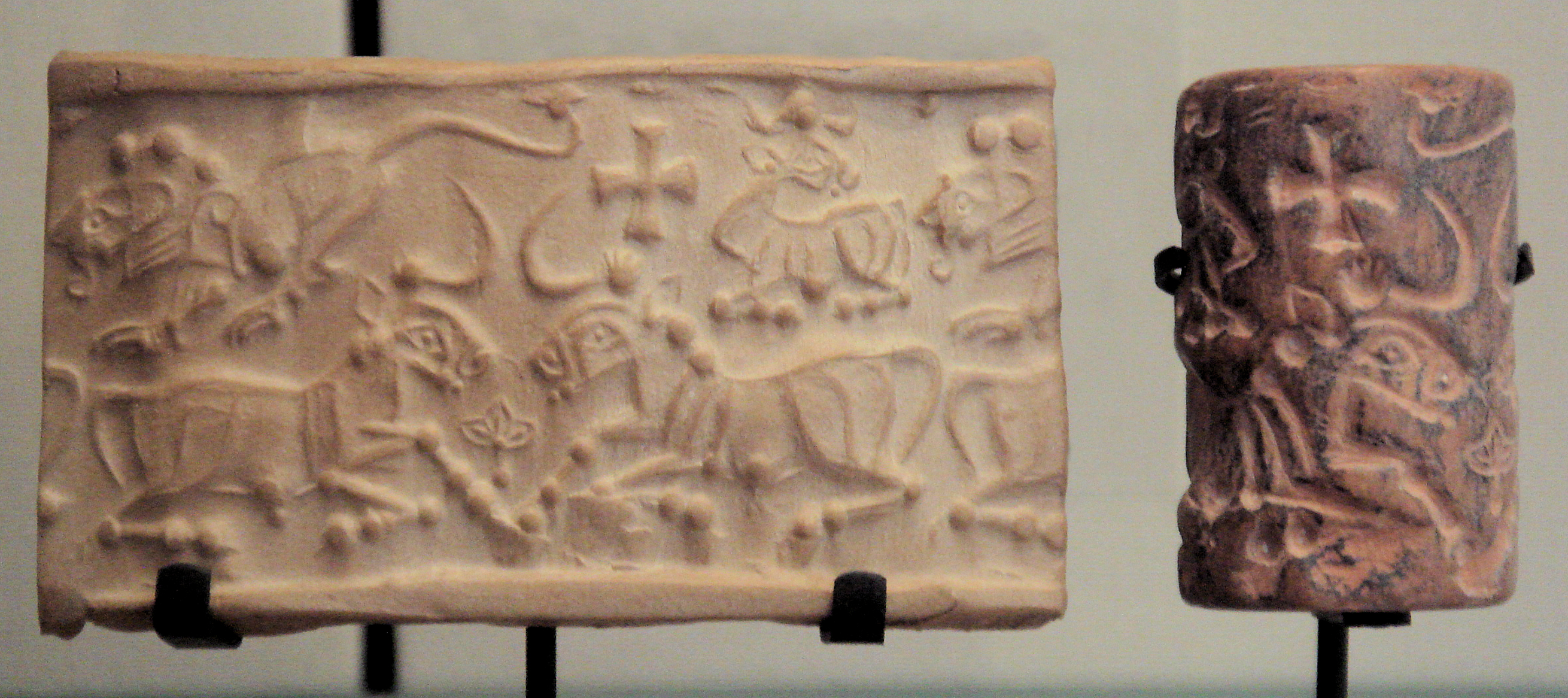
Cylinder seal with bulls and lion from the Proto-Elamite period; c. 3100–2900 BC, excavated in 1932, Louvre Museum, reference Sb 6166.

The Proto-Elamite period, also known as Susa III, is a chronological era in the ancient history of the area of Elam, dating from c. 3100 BC to 2700 BC. In archaeological terms this corresponds to the late Banesh period. Proto-Elamite sites are recognized as the oldest civilization in Iran. The Proto-Elamite script is an Early Bronze Age writing system briefly in use before the introduction of Elamite cuneiform. The Proto-Elamite script has not yet been completely deciphered.

== History ==
=== Background ===
The Proto-Elamite culture, with contemporary polities c. 3000 BC

During the period 8000–3700 BC, the Fertile Crescent witnessed the spread of small settlements supported by agricultural surplus. Geometric tokens emerged to be used to manage stewardship of this surplus. The earliest tokens now known are those from two sites in the Zagros region of Iran: Tepe Asiab and Ganj-i-Dareh Tepe.

The Mesopotamian civilization emerged during the period 3700–2900 BC amid the development of technological innovations such as the plough, sailing boats, and copper metal working. Clay tablets with pictographic characters appeared in this period to record commercial transactions performed by the temples.

=== Proto-Elamite sites ===
The most important Proto-Elamite sites are Susa and Anshan. Another important site is Tepe Sialk, where the only remaining Proto-Elamite ziggurat is still seen. Texts in the undeciphered Proto-Elamite script found in Susa are dated to this period as well as at Tepe Sofalin and Tepe Yahya. It was originally assumed that the Proto-Elamites were in fact Elamites (Elamite speakers), because of cultural similarities (for example, the building of ziggurats), and because no large-scale migration to this area seems to have occurred between the Proto-Elamite period and the later Elamites. As Proto-Elamite writing has now been found over a wider area that is less certain.

Proto-Elamite pottery dating back to the last half of the 5th millennium BC has been found in Tepe Sialk, where Proto-Elamite writing, the first form of writing in Iran, has been found on tablets of this date. The first cylinder seals come from the Proto-Elamite period, as well.

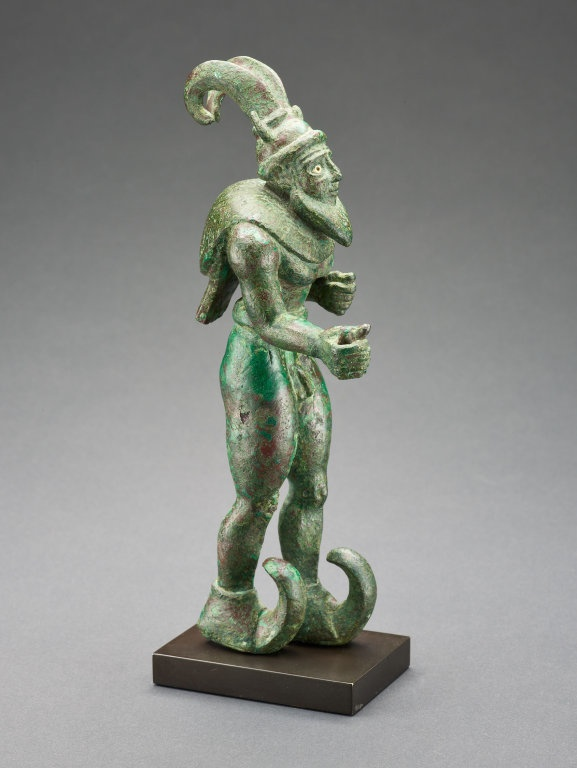
Striding figure, Proto-Elamite or Mesopotamian (3000–2800 BC).

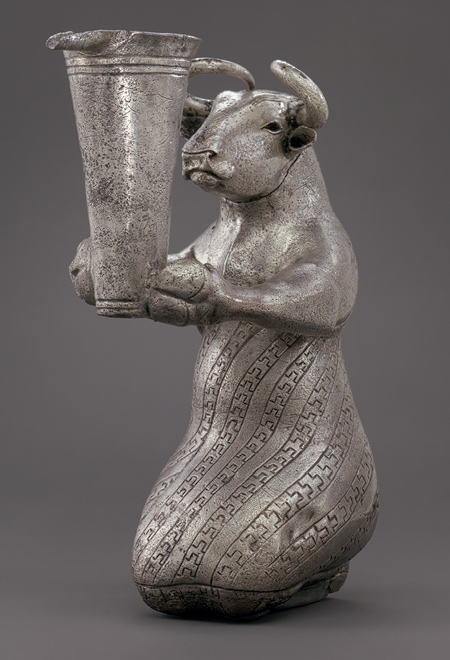
Kneeling Bull with Vessel. Kneeling bull holding a spouted vessel, Proto-Elamite period (3100–2900 BC). Metropolitan Museum of Art

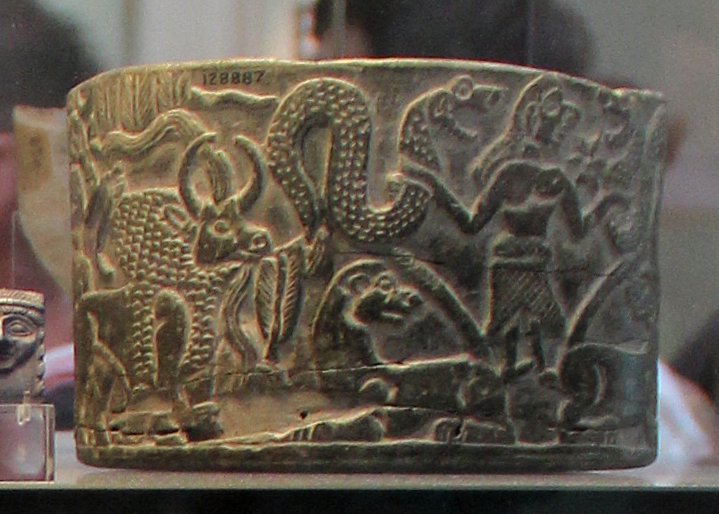
Chlorite vessel with mythological scenes, Early Dynastic III, 2600–2300 BCE; found in Ur but probably made in Iran

== Proto-Elamite cylinder seals ==
Proto-Elamite seals follow the seals of the Uruk period, with which they share many stylistic elements, but display more individuality and a more lively rendering.

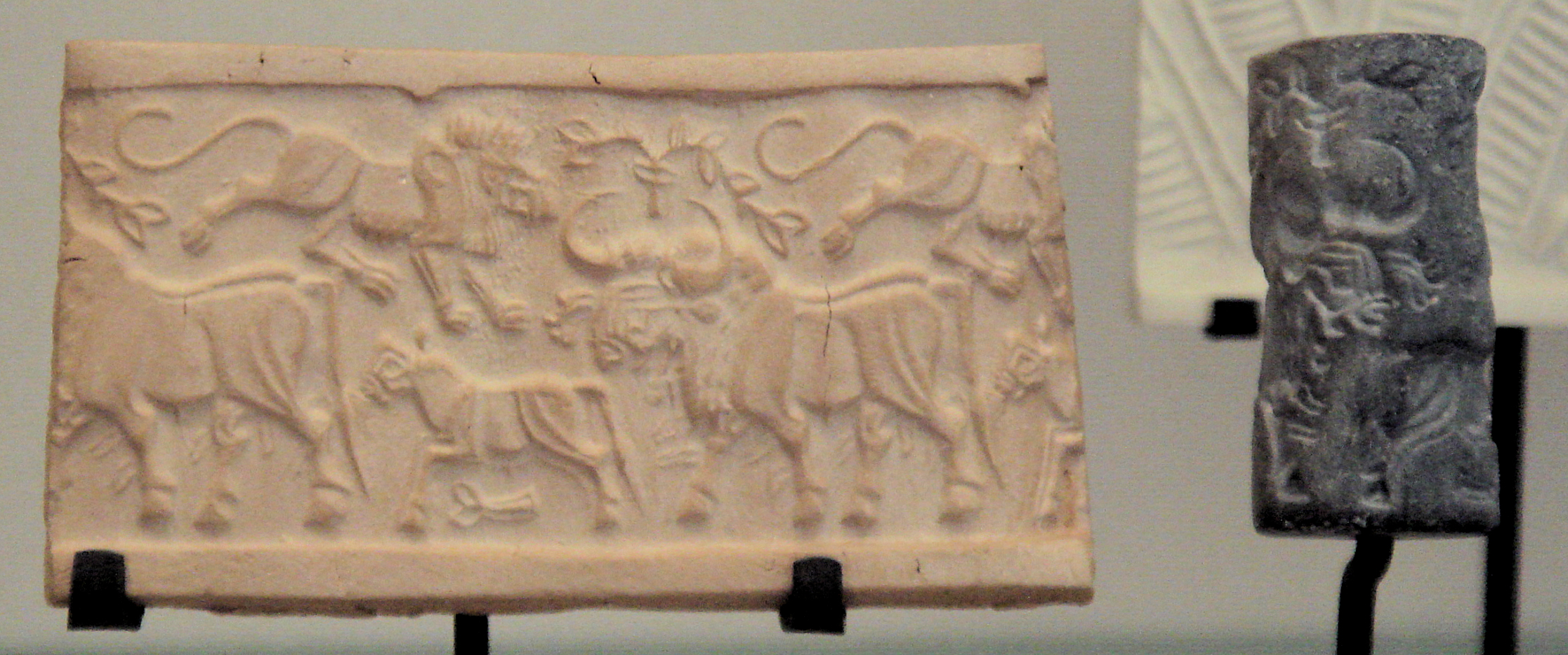
Susa III/ Proto-Elamite cylinder seal, 3150–2800 BC. Louvre Museum, reference Sb 1484

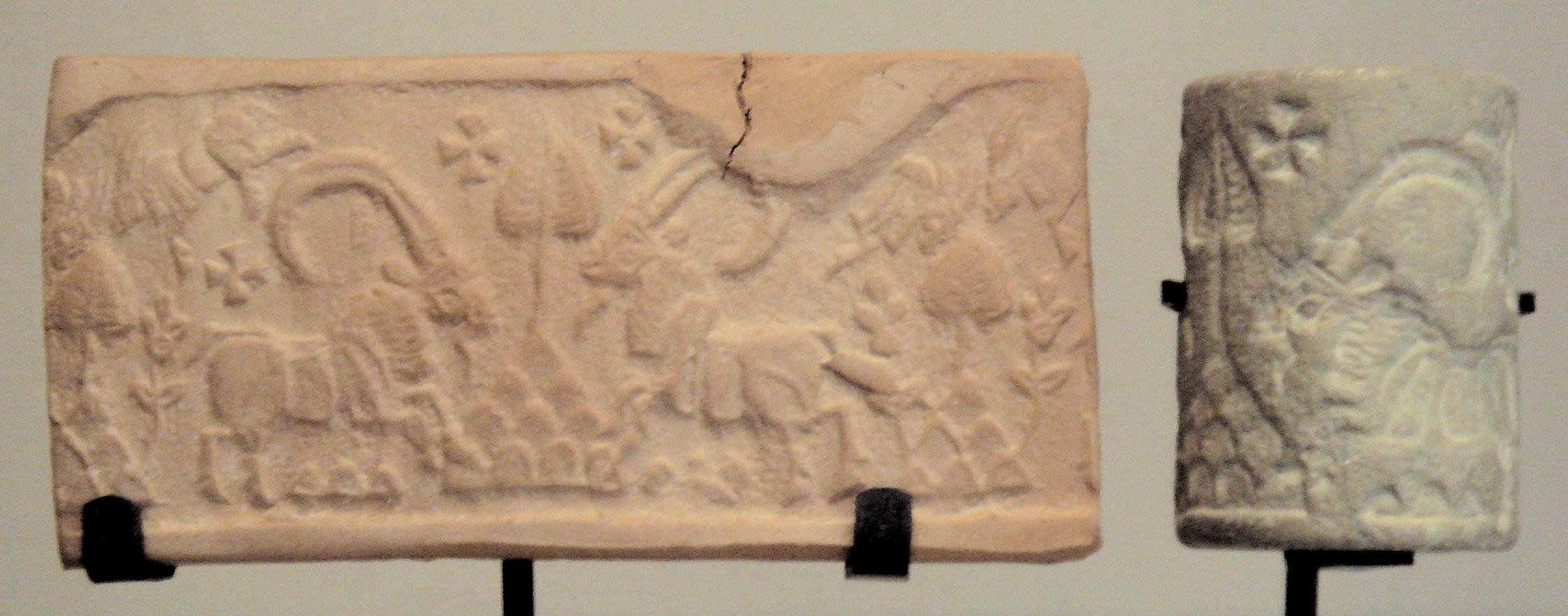
Susa III/ Proto-Elamite cylinder seal 3150–2800 BC Louvre Museum Sb 2675

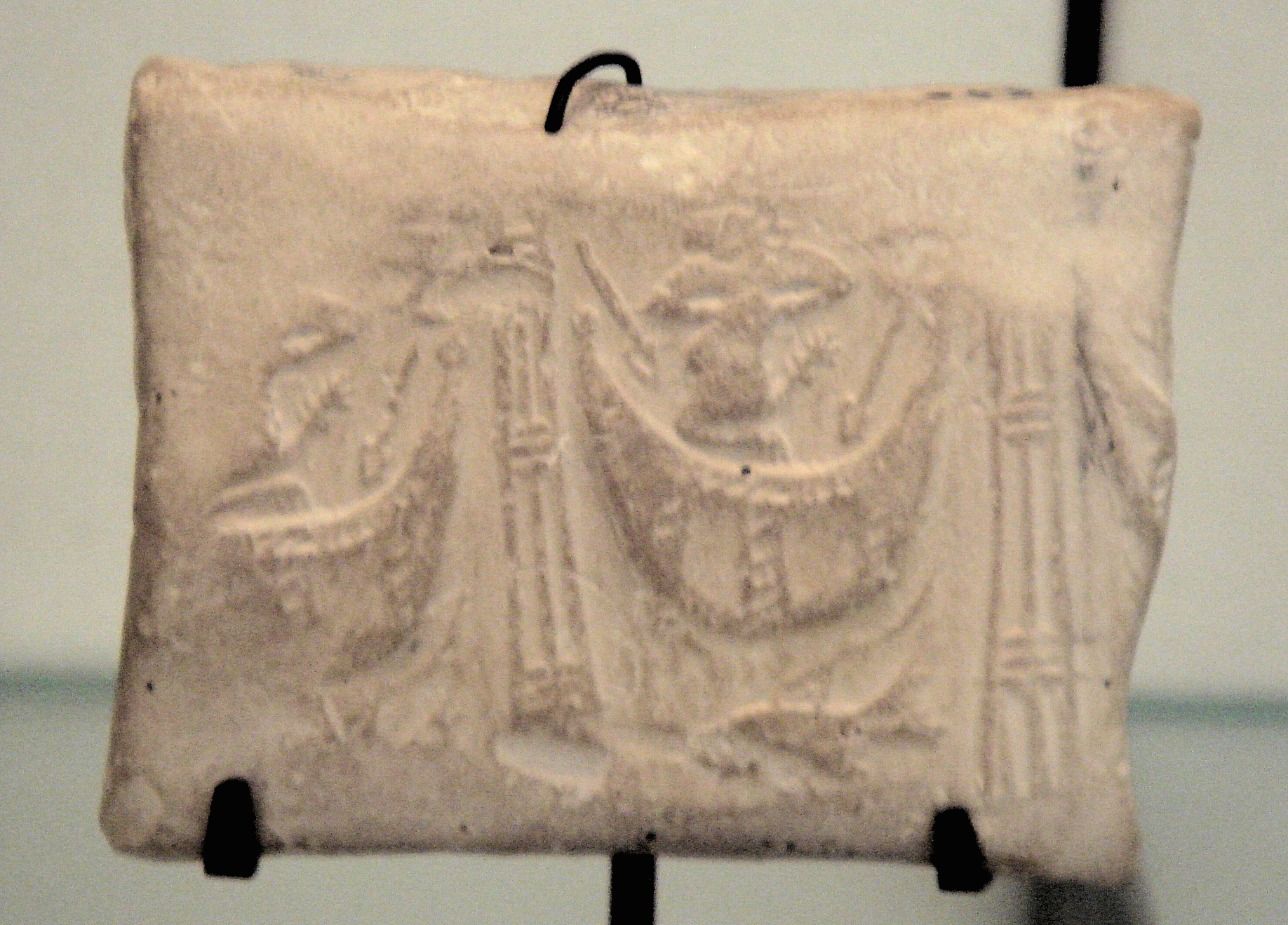
Susa III/ Proto-Elamite cylinder seal 3150–2800 BC Mythological being on a boat Louvre Museum Sb 6379

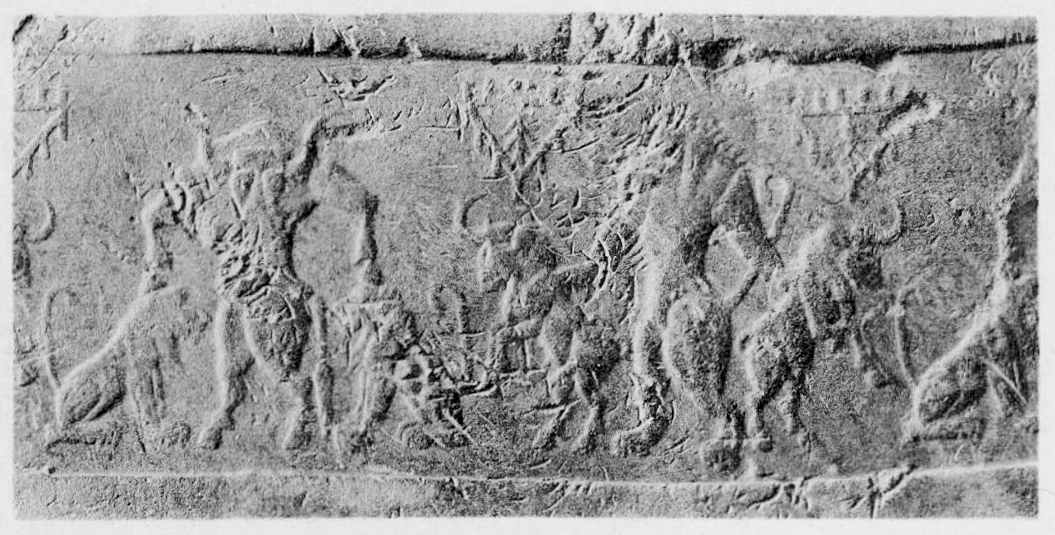
Proto-Elamite seal impression: combat between man-bull and animals

== See also ==
- History of Iran
- Jiroft culture
- Tapeh Tyalineh
