= Tepe Sofalin =

Archaeological site in Iran

- Tappeh Sofalin
- Location within Iran
- 35°18′58″N 51°44′06″E
- Type: settlement
- Periods: Late Chalcolithic, Early Bronze Age, Iron Age III
- Location: Tehran province, Iran

History
- Built: Late 4th millennium BC

Site notes
- Excavation dates: 2006-2007, 2017
- Archaeologists: Morteza Hessari
- Condition: Ruined
- Owner: Public
- Public access: Yes

Tepe Sofalin (also Tappeh Sofalin and Tape Sofalin) is an ancient Near Eastern archeological site on the Tehran Plain south of the Alborz Mountains on the north-central plateau of Iran about 10 kilometers east of the modern city of Varamin and 35 kilometers southeast of the modern city of Tehran. It lies in the Tehran province of Iran. Sofalin means pottery shards in Persian. It was occupied from the Late Chalcolithic period until the Early Bronze period, during the Proto-Elamite Period (also referred to as Susa III), and again in the Iron III period. The site of Tape Shoghali is adjacent and the site of Tepe Hissar is only a few kilometers away.

== Archaeology ==
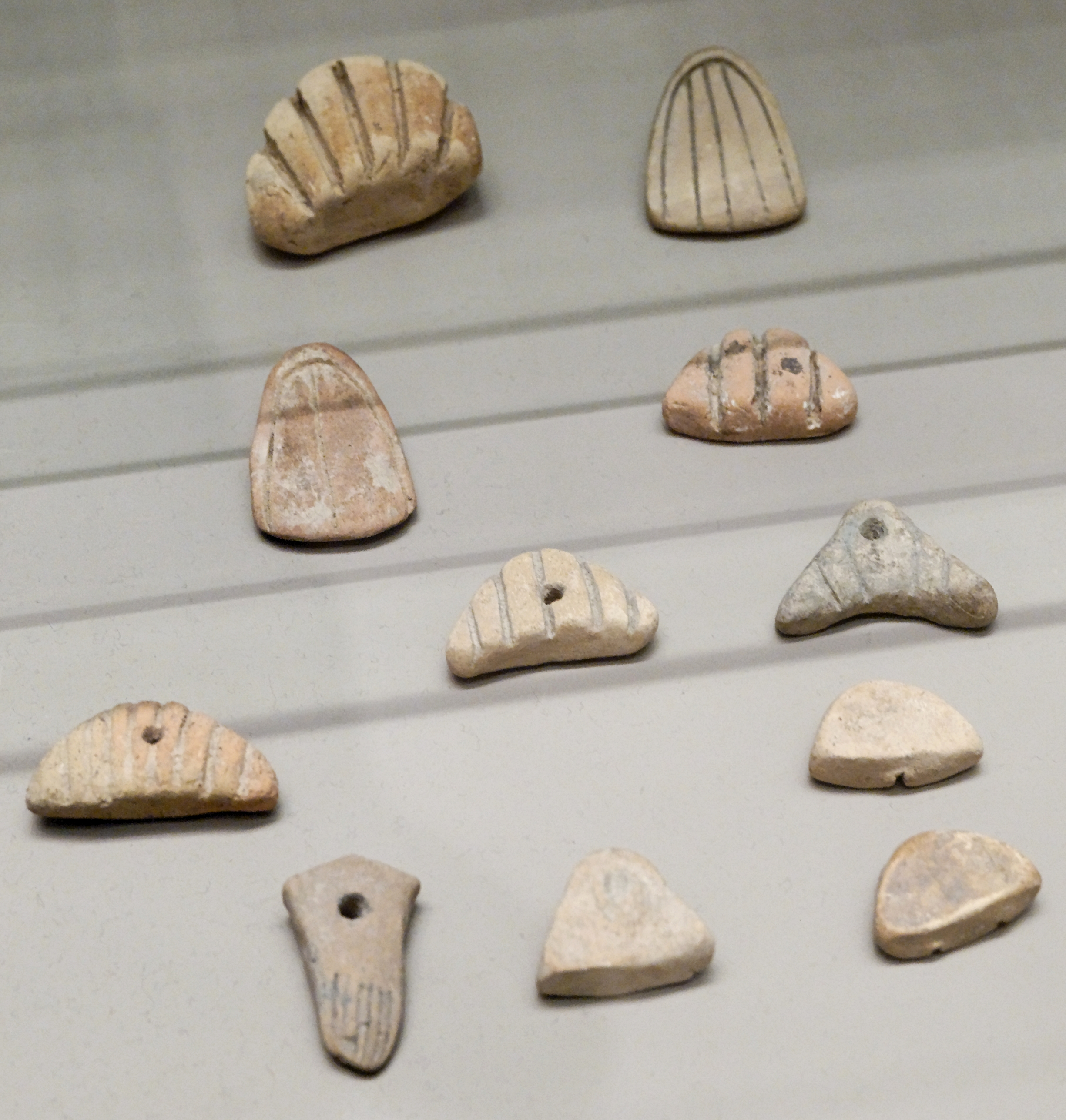
Clay accounting tokens Susa

The site covers an area 500 meters long and 400 meters wide with a height of 10 meters above the plain, established on a natural hill. Some looter holes are present on the surface. Tepe Sofalin was examined during the Tehran Plain Survey in 2004. It was excavated in two seasons from 2006 to 2007 by a Morteza Hessari led team of the Archaeological Service of Islamic Azad University of Varamin-Pishva. Among the finds were inscribed clay tokens, twelve mostly fragmentary Proto-Elamite tablets (one too poorly preserved to read), clay bullae, clay sealings, and blank tablets. Of the 11 readable tablets, one was found in Trench 2 and the rest in Trench 3. Numerous proto-literate clay tokens (spherical, conic, rectangular, triangular, biconvex, jugs and animorphic) were also found. Excavation work continued until 2011 though that work has been thinly published.

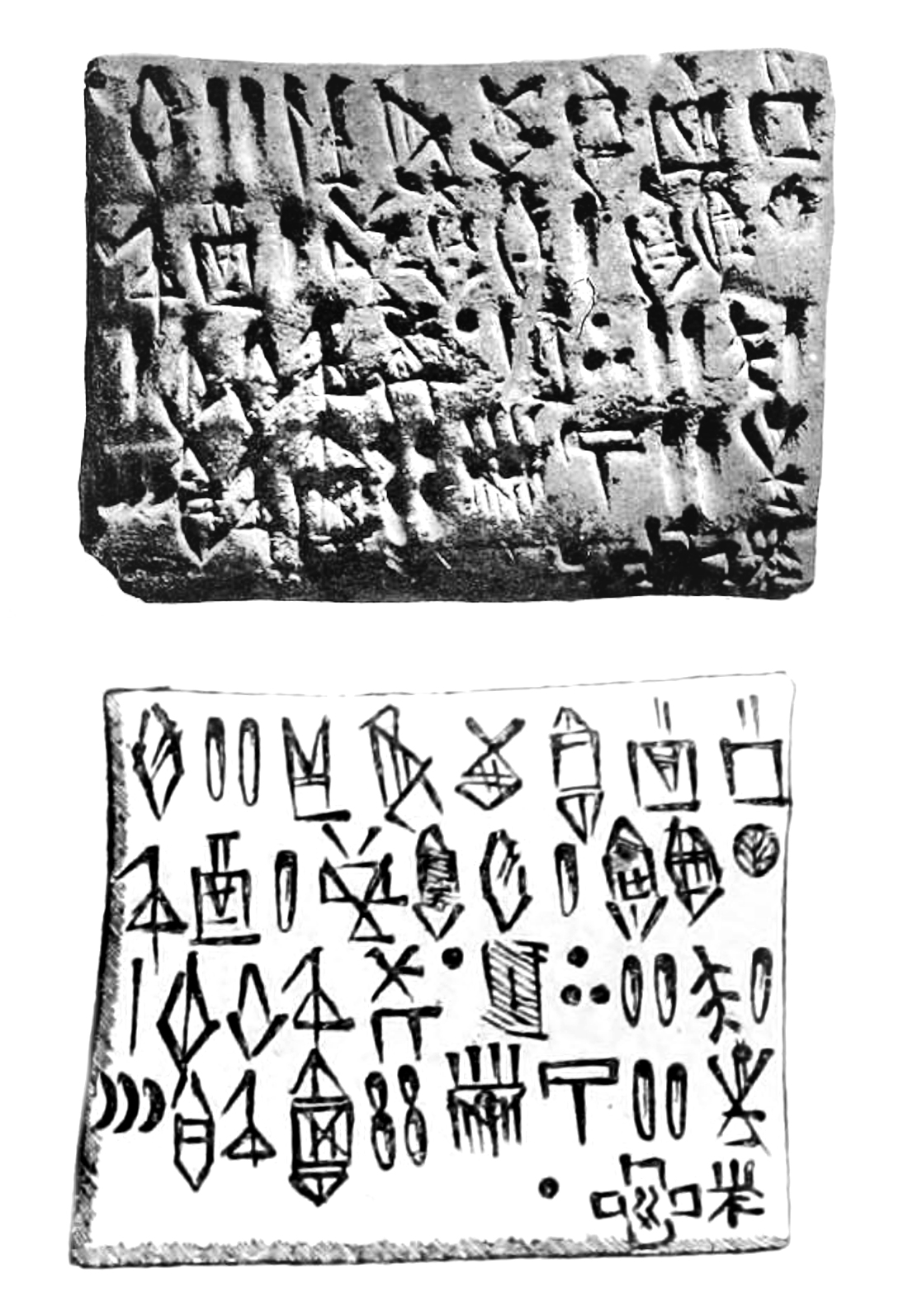
Proto-Elamite tablet with transcription

In 2017 another season of excavation was conducted by the Iranian Center for Archaeological Research and the Freie Universität Berlin. Five trenches were opened and an earlier trench extended. Clay sealings and tokens were found. Five samples were submitted for radiocarbon dating (OxCal 4.3, IntCal 13). The radiocarbon dates ranged from 3500 to 2900 BC (Late Uruk to Proto-Elamite). A thirteenth Proto-Elamite tablet was recently recovered, largely complete. It has been suggested that it uses a numerical system not previously seen in the Proto-Elamite script. Gas chromatography-mass spectrometry of the residue in a Bevel Rim Bowl found beeswax. Several jar burials (of children) and pit graves from the Proto-Elamite period have also been excavated and furnaces for the processing of silver uncovered. A number of pottery shards from the shoulders of large storage vessels that had been sealed using cylinder seals, an Early Iron Age practice, were found.

It has been said that there are a number of other Proto-Elamite text from the site which are as yet unpublished.

== History ==
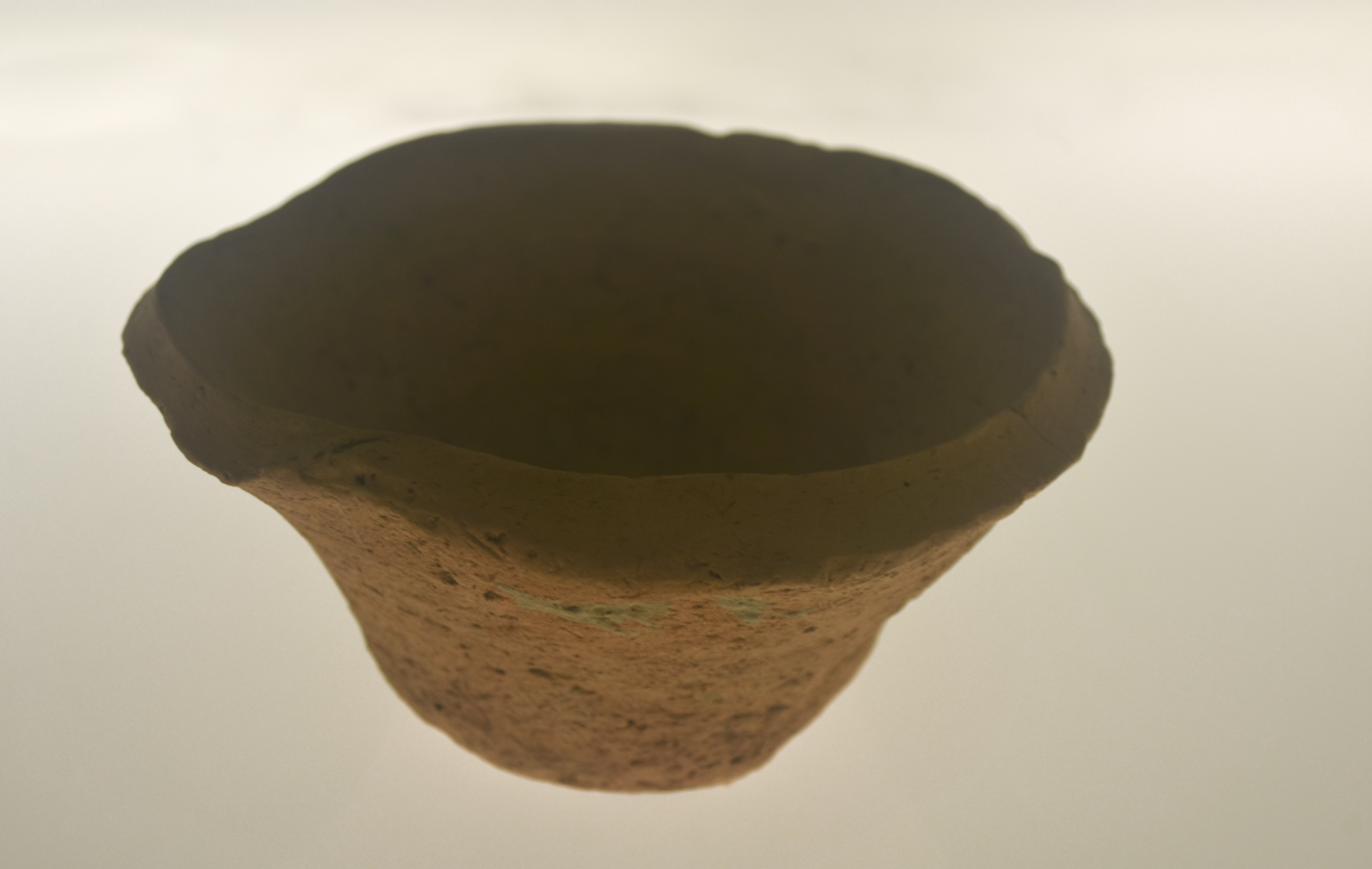
Beveled rim bowl of the Uruk Period

Occupation began in the late 4th millennium BC (Late Chalcolithic) to early 3rd millennium BC (Early Bronze Age) periods then, after a period of abandonment occupation resumed until the Iron Age III period. In the early occupation ceramics and epigraphic remains from the Proto-Elamite period (equivalent to Susa III) were found as well as Beveled Rimmed Bowls of the Uruk period (equivalent to Susa II) type.

== See also ==
- Cities of the ancient Near East
- Chronology of the ancient Near East
- Anshan
- Tepe Yahya
- Tepe Sialk
