= Gerdkooh Hills =

- تپه باستانی گردکوه جمنان (Persian)
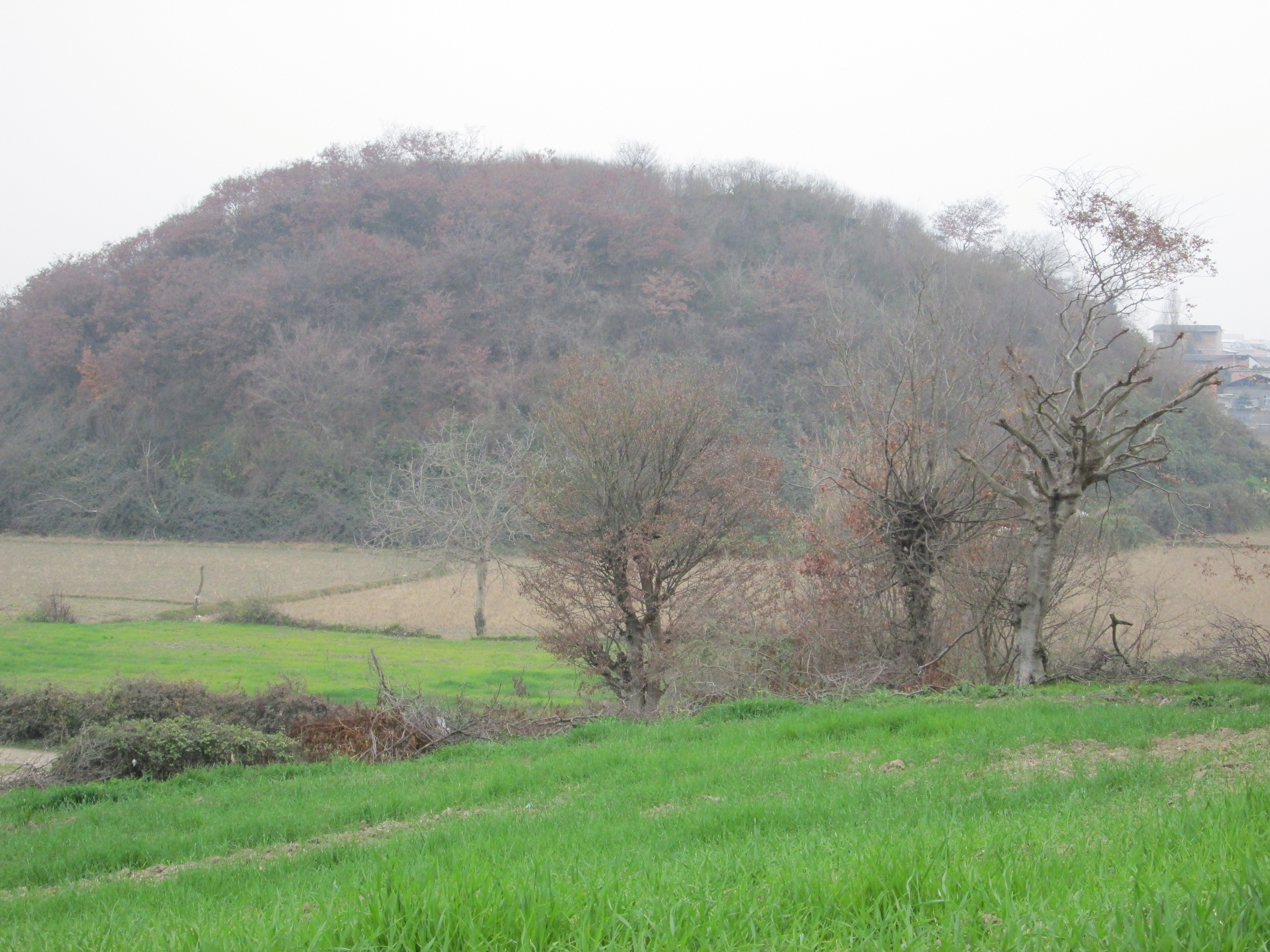

- Location within Iran
- 36°27′37.04″N 52°52′55.26″E
- Type: Settlement
- Location: Mazandaran Province, Iran

Site notes
- Height: 26 m (85 ft)
- Condition: In ruins

Gerdkooh ancient hills (Persian: تپه باستان گردکوه) consists of three hills, the tallest of which is 26 m in height. Their history has been estimated to date back to the Iron Age. The hills are located in Qaem Shahr in Mazandaran Province. In exploring this area, a 4500-year-old grave has been found, as well as objects such as disposable tableware dishes related to the Parthian Empire and Sasanian Empire. There is evidence that the hills at the time of the Sasanian Empire and Muslim conquest of Persia were part of a Castle.

== See also ==
- Castles in Iran
- Tepe Sialk
