= Kneeling Bull with Vessel =

Small silver bull statue

Kneeling Bull With Vessel
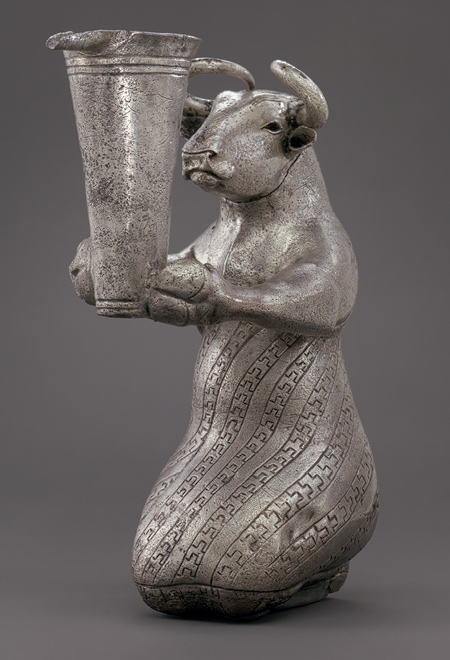
- Material: Silver
- Created: 3100–2900 BC
- Period/culture: Proto-Elamite
- Present location: Metropolitan Museum of Art

The Kneeling Bull With Vessel is a small 6 3/8 inches (16.3 cm) tall statue made of silver with an animal upper part of a bull holding a vessel with pebbles inside and a lower part shaped in the body of a kneeling human wearing a patterned article of clothing. The artist is unknown, and it is also not known if it has any spiritual connotations.

Art such as this shows vigorously developing cultural environments, including the building of cities and development of writing, around the Southern Mesopotamia region in South West Iran and border regions of Iraq around the 3100–2900 B.C. Animals in human postures were common in Proto-Elamite art. The statue is on display at the Metropolitan Museum of Art in the Ancient West Asian Art section.
