= Roman Ghirshman =

French archaeologist (1895–1979)

- Роман Гиршман
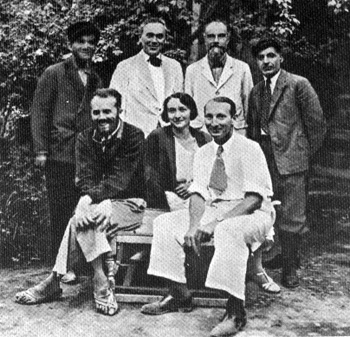
- Ghirshman's team in Sialk in 1934: Bottom row, sitting from R to L: Roman Ghirshman, Tania Ghirshman, and Georges Contenau.
- Born: 3 October 1895; Kharkiv, Kharkov Governorate, Russian Empire
- Died: 5 September 1979 (aged 83); Budapest, Hungary

Roman Ghirshman (Russian: Роман Михайлович Гиршман, Roman Mikhailovich Girshman; 3 October 1895 – 5 September 1979) was a Russian-born French archeologist who specialized in ancient Persia. Ghirshman spent nearly thirty years excavating ancient Persian archeological sites throughout Iran and Afghanistan.

== Biography ==
Roman Ghirshman was born to a wealthy Jewish family in Kharkov in the Sloboda Ukraine (present-day Ukraine) in 1895. Ghirshman moved to Paris in 1917 to study Archeology and Ancient Languages. He was mainly interested in the archeological ruins of Iran, specifically Tepe Giyan, Teppe Sialk, Bagram in Afghanistan, Bishapur in Fars, and Susa.

In the 1930s, Girshman, together with his wife Tania Ghirshman, was the first to excavate Teppe Sialk. His studies on Chogha Zanbil have been printed in 4 volumes, and he also led excavation teams at Kharg Island, Iwan-i Karkheh, and the Parthian platforms in Masjed Soleiman, near Izeh, Khuzestan.

From 1941 to 1942 he was Director of the French Archaeological Delegation in Afghanistan. He was also a member of the Académie des Inscriptions et Belles-Lettres.

With 300 papers and 20 books published, Ghirshman was one of the most prolific and respected experts on ancient Iran. Some of his works on Susa have not even been published yet, but have served other archeologists such as Jean Perrot and Hermann Gasche in subsequent follow-up studies in the 1960s and 1970s in Iran.

He died in Budapest of a stroke on 5 September 1979. The French scholar Jacques Heurgon wrote a eulogy for his death.

== Honours ==
- Charles Lang Freer Medal
- Legion of Honour

== Selected works ==
In a statistical overview derived from writings by and about Roman Ghirshman, OCLC/WorldCat encompasses roughly 300+ works in 600+ publications in 12 languages and 6,000+ library holdings.

- 1935, Fouilles du Tepe Giyan, Paris, Librairie Orientaliste Paul Geuthner 12.Rue Vavin(VI)
- 1938, Fouilles de Sialk, prés de Kashan, 1933, 1934, 1937. Librairie Orientaliste Paul Geuthner, Paris (in two volumes).
- 1954, Iran: from the earliest times to the Islamic conquest. Penguin books.(A French version was published in 1951 by Payot, Paris).
- 1962, Persian art : Parthian and Sassanian dynasties, 249 B.C.- A.D. 651.
- 1963, Perse. Proto-iraniens, Mèdes, Achéménides. Gallimard, Paris.
- 1970, Le Pazuzu et les fibules du Luristan. Impr. Catholique, Beirut.
- 1971, Persia, the immortal kingdom. (Coauthors: Minorsky, V.F., and Sanghvi, R., Greenwich, Conn., New York Graphic Society.
- 1976, L'Iran des origines à l'Islam. Nouv. éd. rev. et mise à jour. Paris.
- 1977, L'Iran et la migration des Indo-Aryens et des Iraniens. Leiden.
- 1979, Tombe princière de Ziwiyé et le début de l'art animalier scythe. Soc. Iranienne pour la Conservation du Patrimoine, Paris.
