= Tania Ghirshman =

French archaeologist (1900–1984)

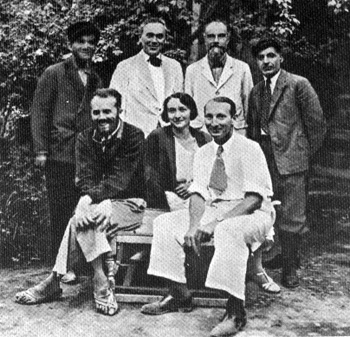
Tania (seated, centre) and Roman Ghirshman (seated, right) and their excavation team at Tepe Sialk, 1934

Tania Ghirshman (1900–1984), born Antoinette Levienne, was a French archaeologist and restorationist of Ukrainian origin. Originally a dentist, Ghirshman became involved in archaeology after her marriage to Roman Ghirshman, with whom she directed numerous excavations in Iran and Afghanistan, most notably the ancient city of Susa. She abandoned her career as a dental surgeon and adapted her skills in dentistry to restoration accompanying her husband Roman Ghirshman on all of his missions providing much practical support especially during difficult circumstances. Drawing the illustration for his works she also helped in restorative works on the excavated projects, as well as providing reproductions for her husband's publications. Her memoir, Archéologue malgré moi (Archaeologist in Spite of Myself), was awarded a Prix Broquette-Gonin in literature by the Académie française in 1971. Her memoir gave a colourful description of her life on the missions with her husband.

== Awards ==
Ghirshman was awarded a Prix Broquette-Gonin in literature by the Académi française for the completion of her memoir "Archéologue malgré moi" or "Archaeologist in Spite of Myself" in 1971.
