= Proto-Elamite script =

Early Bronze Age writing system in present-day Iran

Proto-Elamite
- Period: c. 3100 – c. 2900 BC
- Direction: Left-to-right

ISO 15924
- ISO 15924: Pelm (016), Proto-Elamite

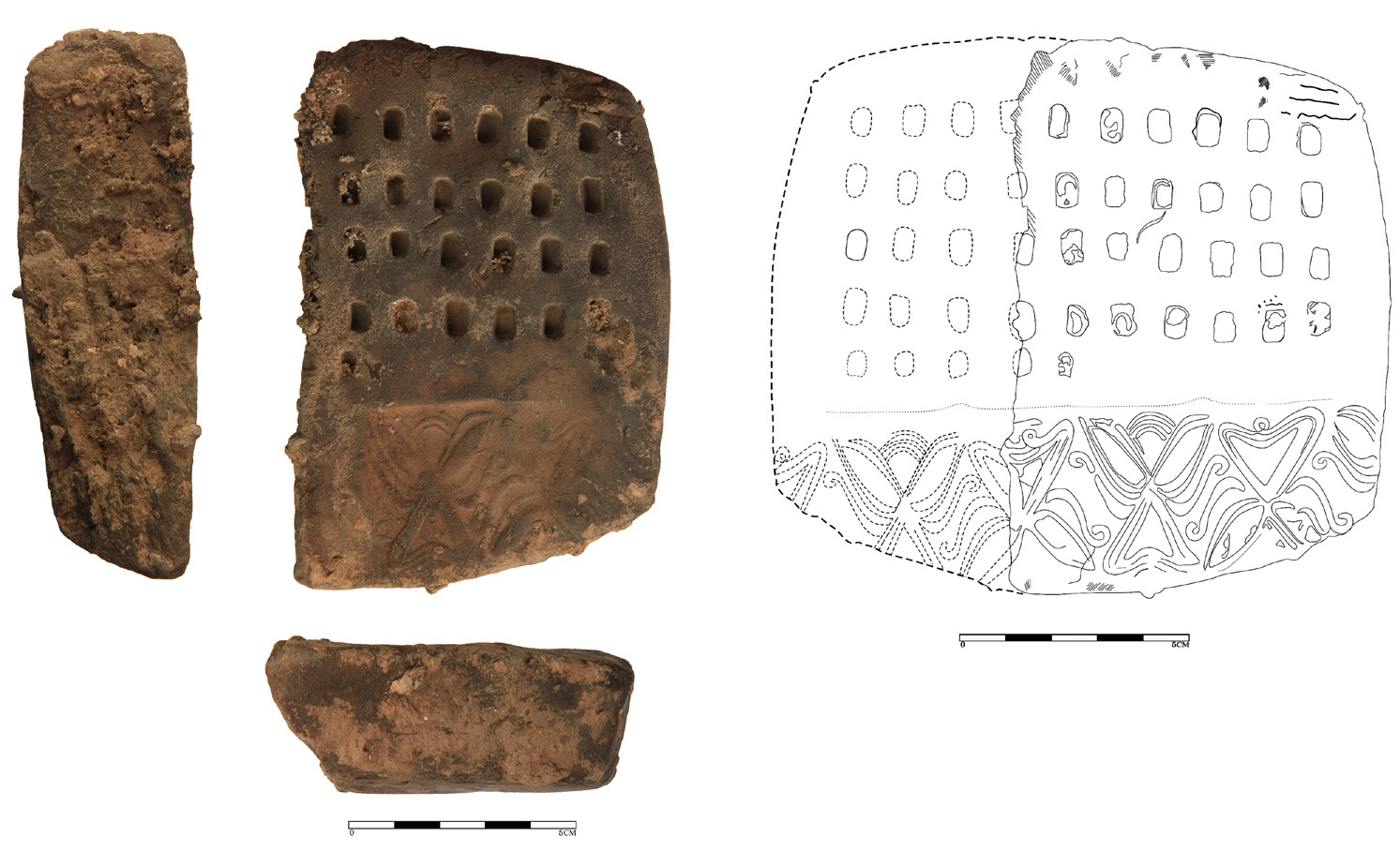
Proto-Elamite tablets from Shahr-i Sokhta

The Proto-Elamite script is a writing system used briefly during the early Bronze Age before the introduction of Elamite cuneiform. It remains largely undeciphered, except for various numbers.

There are many similarities between the writing systems of the Proto-Elamite tablets and the contemporaneous proto-cuneiform tablets of the Uruk IV period in Mesopotamia. Both are relatively isolated. Singletons aside, tablets have been found at only five Proto-Elamite sites. For comparison, Proto-cuneiform tablets have only been found at Uruk, Jemdet Nasr, Khafajah, and Tell Uqair, and the vast majority of each type have been found at Susa and Uruk. The tablet blanks, the inscribing method, even the practice of using the reverse for summation, when needed, are the same. They serve the same basic function which is administrative accounting of goods in a centrally controlled society. From that base, there are also differences, the signs themselves being the most obvious but extending to smaller areas such as the order in which the tablet was inscribed, are clear. The many similarities between the numeric systems of Proto-cuneiform and Proto-Elamite have helped in understanding it. Proto-Elamite, in addition to the usual sexagesimal and base-120, also uses a decimal system.

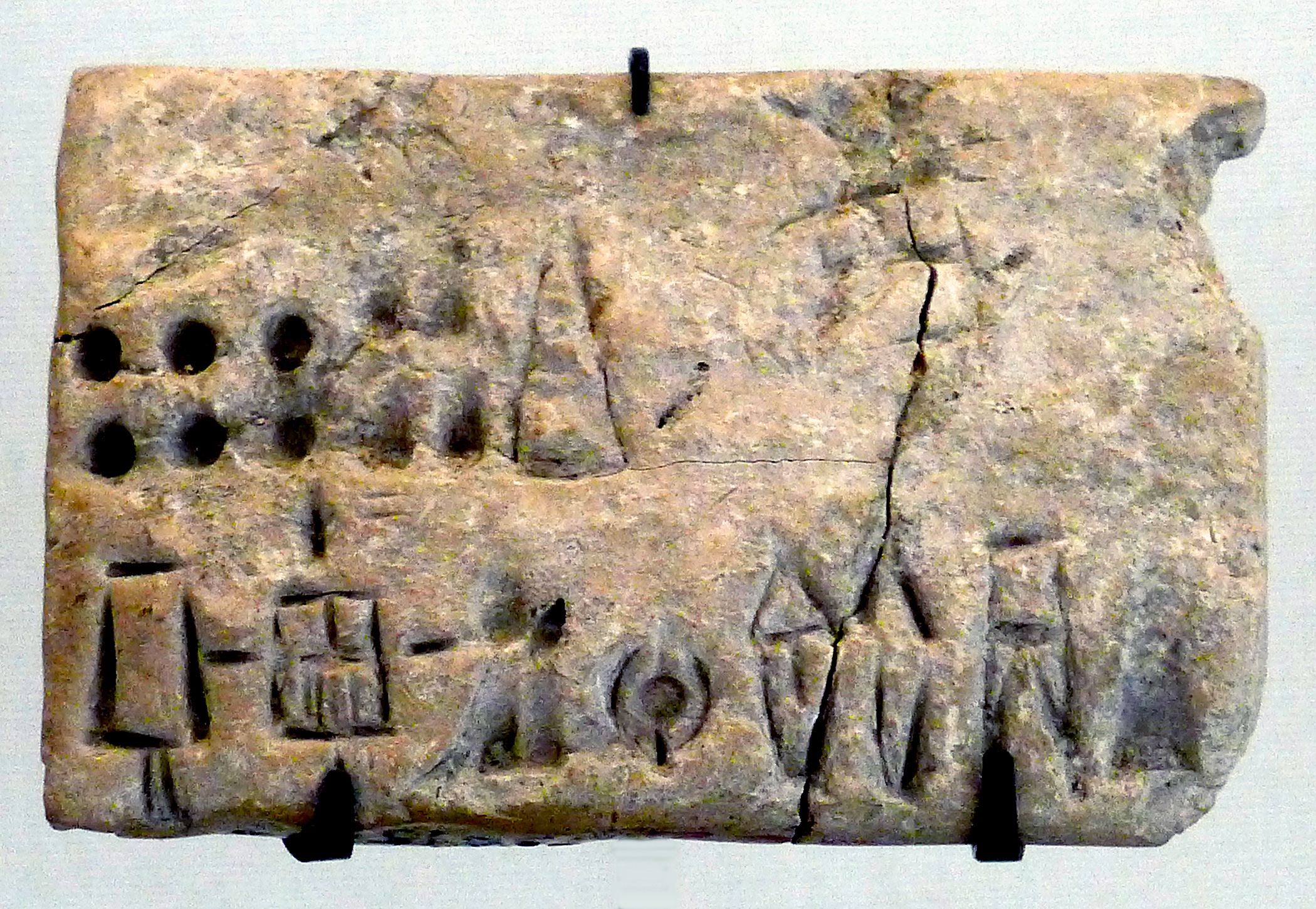
Economical tablet in Proto-Elamite, Suse III, Louvre Museum, reference Sb 15200, c. 3100–2850 BC

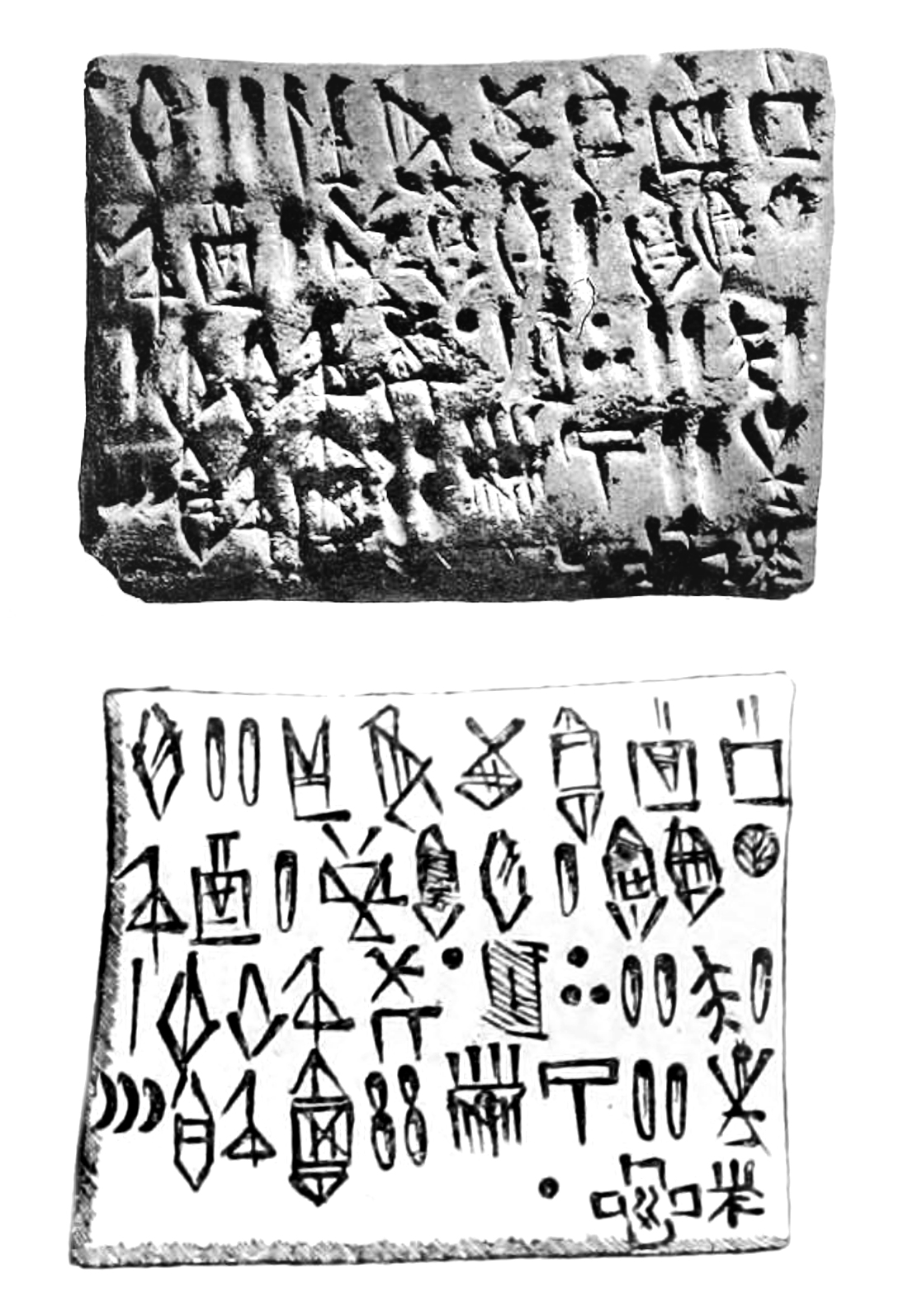
Proto-Elamite tablet with transcription

Beginning around the 9th millennium BC, a token based system came into use in various parts of the ancient Near East. These evolved into marked tokens and later marked envelopes, often called clay bullae. These are believed to be the basis of Proto-Elamite as well as proto-cuneiform (with many of the tokens, about two-thirds, having been found in Susa). Tokens remained in use after the development of proto-cuneiform and Proto-Elamite.

The earliest tablets contain only lists of numbers. They are found not only at Susa and Uruk, but also at sites without later Proto-Elamite and proto-cuneiform tablets, like Tell Brak, Habuba Kabira, Tepe Hissar, Godin Tepe and Jebel Aruda.

Linear Elamite is attested much later, in the last quarter of the 3rd millennium BCE. It is uncertain whether the Proto-Elamite script was the direct predecessor of Linear Elamite, since it remains largely undeciphered, and a postulated relationship between the two is speculative.

Early on, similarities were noted between Proto-Elamite and the Cretan Linear A script.

== Corpus ==
The Proto-Elamite writing system was used over a large area, from Susa in the west to Tepe Yahya in the east. The corpus consists of some 1600 tablets, the vast majority unearthed at Susa, where the first two tablets were found by Jacques de Morgan in the late 1800s.

Proto-Elamite tablets have been found at the following sites:

- Susa (more than 1600 tablets and fragments)
- Anshan, or Tall-I Malyan (33 tablets and fragments)
- Tepe Yahya (27 tablets, tablet blanks found)
- Tepe Sofalin (12 tablets and fragments)
- Tepe Sialk (5 tablets)
- Ozbaki (one tablet)
- Shahr-e Sukhteh (one tablet)
- Tall-e Geser (one numerical tablet fragment, not Proto-Elamite script)
- Tepe Hissar (one tablet)

Glyphs found in Proto-Elamite texts are divided in numerical (with an N prefix) and text (with a M prefix). Of the 1000s of text glyphs in the current corpus, more than half are numerical. The meaning of a numerical glyph may depend on which system it is being used in, decimal (D), sexagesimal (S), bisexagesimal (B), or capacity (C).

A significant number of Proto-Elamite tablets remain unpublished.

== Publications ==
- MDP 6 - V. Scheil, "Textes élamites-sémitiques (Troisième série)", Mémoires de La Délégation En Perse 6, Paris: Leroux, 1905
- MDP 17 - V. Scheil, "Textes de Comptabilité Proto-Élamites (Nouvelle Série)", Mémoires de La Mission Archéologique de Perse, Tome 17, Paris, 1923
- MDP 26 - V. Scheil, "Textes de Comptabilité Proto-Élamites (Troisième Série)", Mémoires de La Mission Archéologique de Perse, Tome 26., Paris, 1935
- MDP 31 - Mecquenem, Roland de, and Marguerite Rutten, "Épigraphie Proto-Élamite ; Archéologie Susienne", Mémoires de La Délégation Archéologique En Iran, Tome 31. Paris: Presses Universitaires de France, 1949
- RA 50 - de MECQUENEM, R., "Notes Protoélamites", Revue d’Assyriologie et d’archéologie Orientale, vol. 50, no. 4, pp. 200–04, 1956
- TCL 32 - Dahl, J. L., "Proto-Elamite Tablets and Fragments", Textes Cunéiforme du Louvre 32, Paris: Khéops /Louvre éditions Publishing, 2019

== Decipherment attempts ==
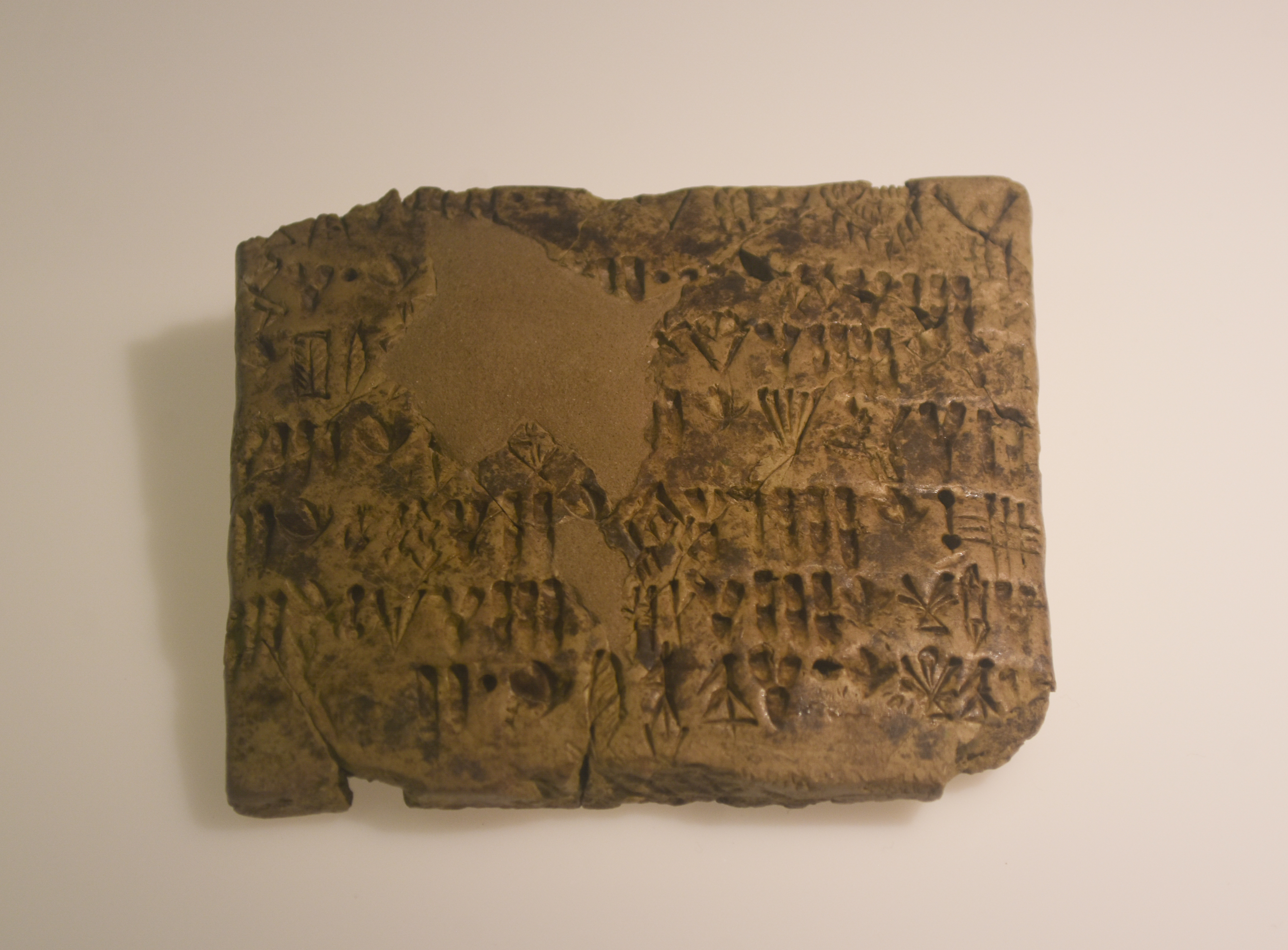
Proto-Elamite tablet found at Tepe Yahya

The first step in deciphering an unknown writing system is publishing the corpus and developing a proposed sign list. The texts have now been mostly published but the sign list is still in progress. Proto-Elamite has many singleton signs (like early stages of proto-cuneiform) because texts are primarily consumed locally. There is disagreement over whether some signs are different or merely variants; but by 1974 enough of a consensus on the signs was reached that decipherment could advance.

In 2012, Dr Jacob Dahl of the University of Oxford announced a project to publish high-quality images of Proto-Elamite clay tablets online. He hopes that crowdsourcing by academics and amateurs working together will make progress. Nearly 1600 Proto-Elamite tablets are now on line. Materials were put online on a wiki of the Cuneiform Digital Library Initiative.

In 2020, François Desset, of the Laboratoire Archéorient in Lyon, announced a proposed decipherment and translation. In 2022 he proposed sign forms for Proto-Elamite (recasting it as "Early Proto-Iranian"). The proposal was not met with universal agreement.

Although the decipherment of Proto-Elamite remains uncertain, the content of many texts is known. This is because certain signs, notably a majority of the numerical signs, are similar to the neighboring Mesopotamian proto-cuneiform. In addition, a number of the Proto-Elamite signs depict the objects they represent. However, the majority of the Proto-Elamite signs are abstract, and their meanings can only be deciphered through careful graphemic analysis.

An example from a small tablet (Sb 06355) from Susa where most signs are known:

M384_{ab} M362, 4(N14) 7(N01) M367, 8(N01) M346, 6(N01)# [M006], [6(N01)?] M362_{a} , 1(N14) M367_{a}# , 2(N01)# [M346_{a}], [1(N01)] [M006@g] [1(N01)] - Transliteration
47 nanny goats (belonging to) x, 8 billy goats, 6 female sheep, 6 male sheep, 10 female kids, 2 male kids, 1 female lamb, 1 male lamb - Translation

While the Elamite language has been suggested as the language of the Proto-Elamite inscriptions, there is no positive evidence of this. The earliest Proto-Elamite inscriptions, being purely ideographic, do not in fact contain any linguistic information nor is it known what language was spoken in the area during the Proto-Elamite Period.

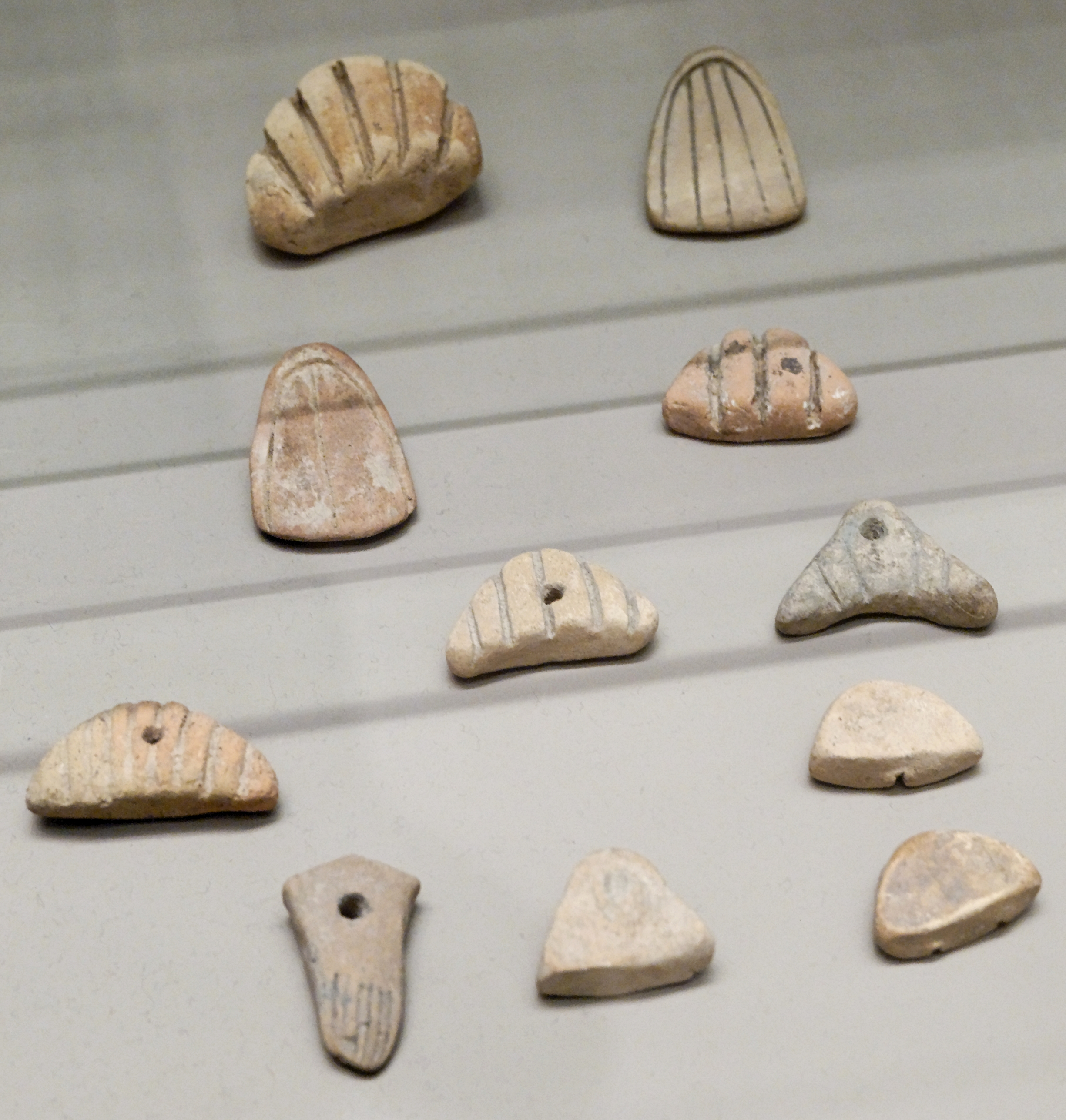
Clay tokens; circa 3500 BC (Susa II or "Uruk period"); terracotta; from Susa; Louvre (Paris)

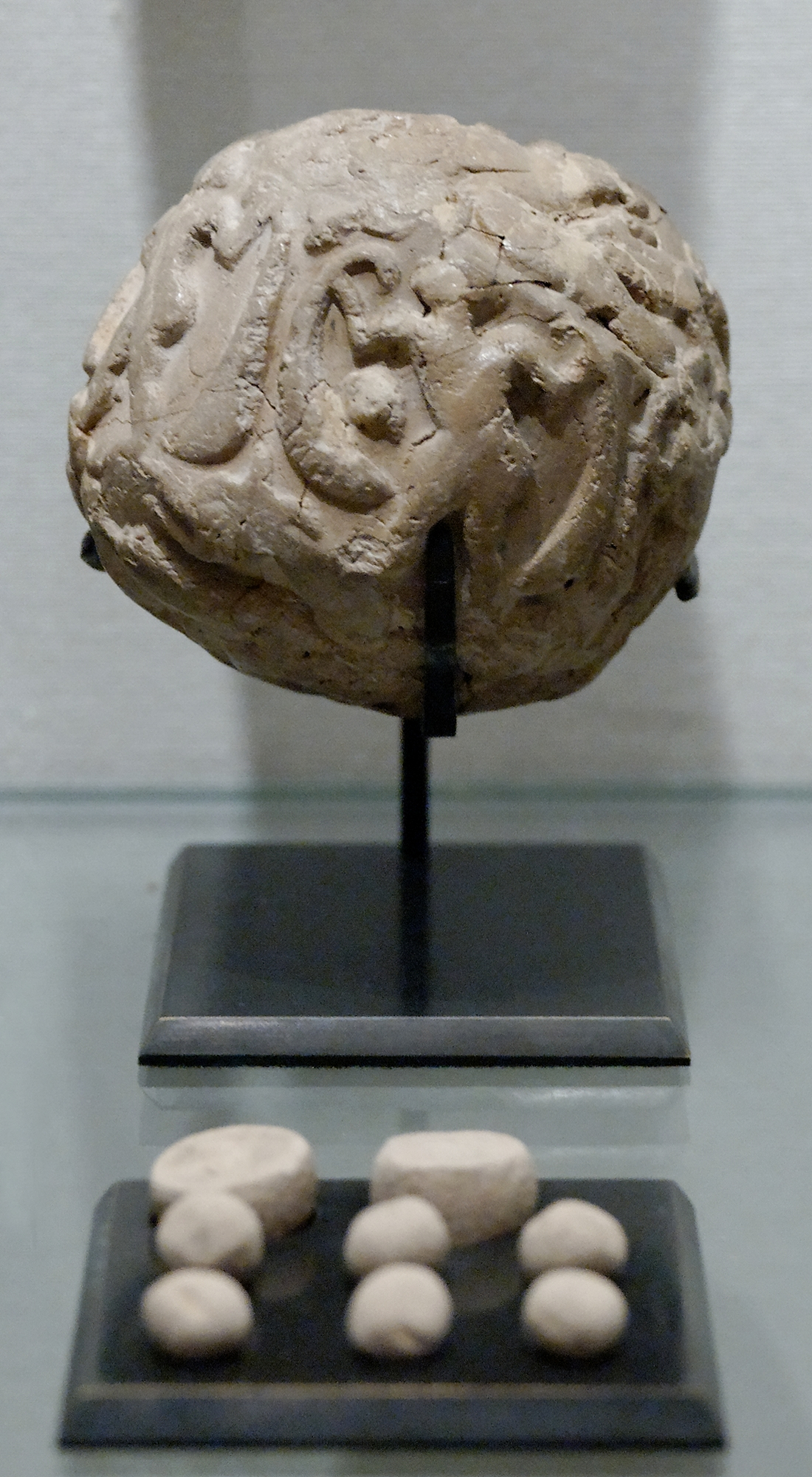
Globular envelope with a cluster of accounting tokens. Clay, Uruk period. From the Tell of the Acropolis in Susa. Susa II or "Uruk period"

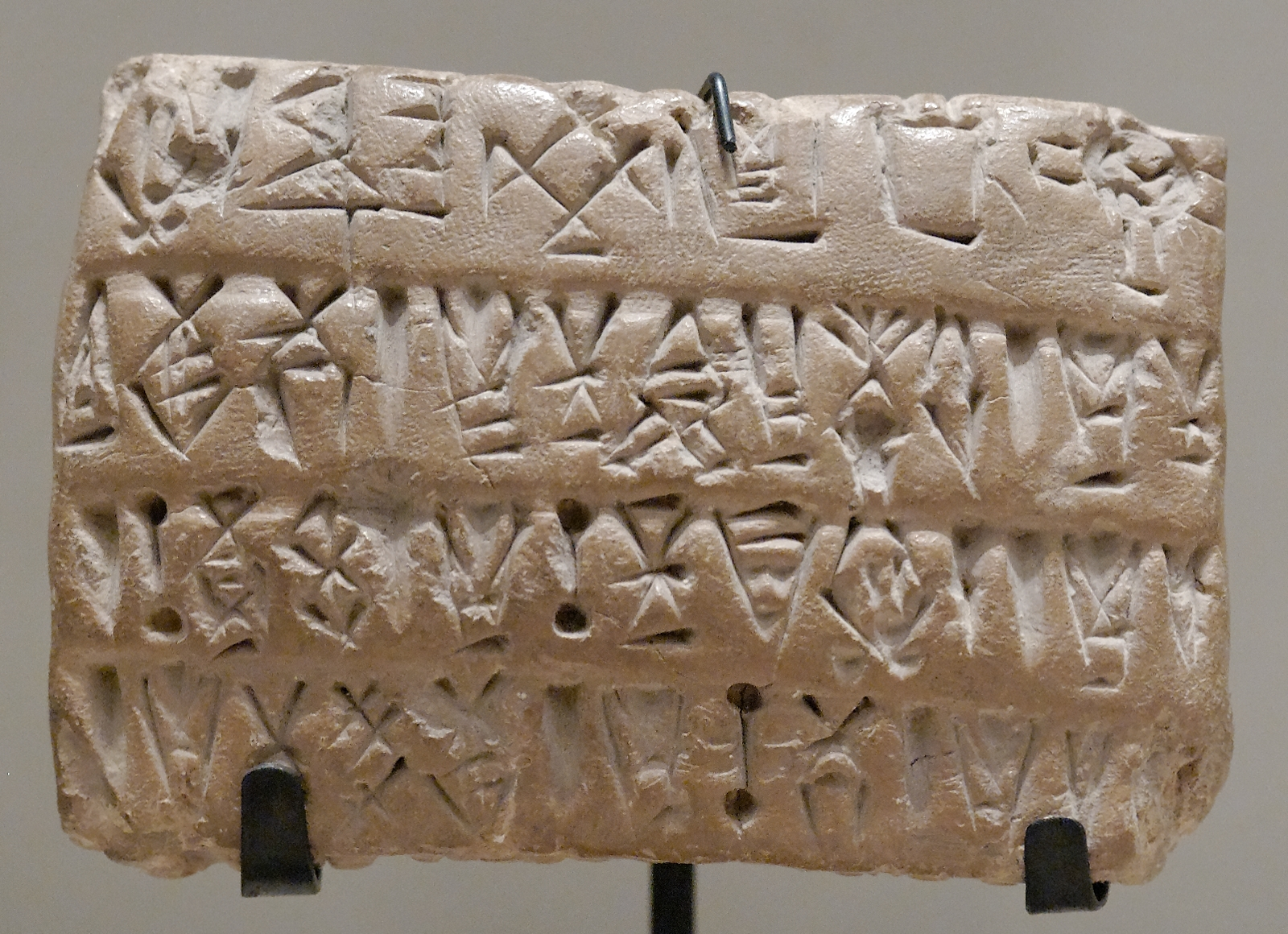
Economic tablet with numeric signs and Proto-Elamite script. Clay accounting tokens, Uruk period. From the Tell of the Acropolis in Susa. Susa III

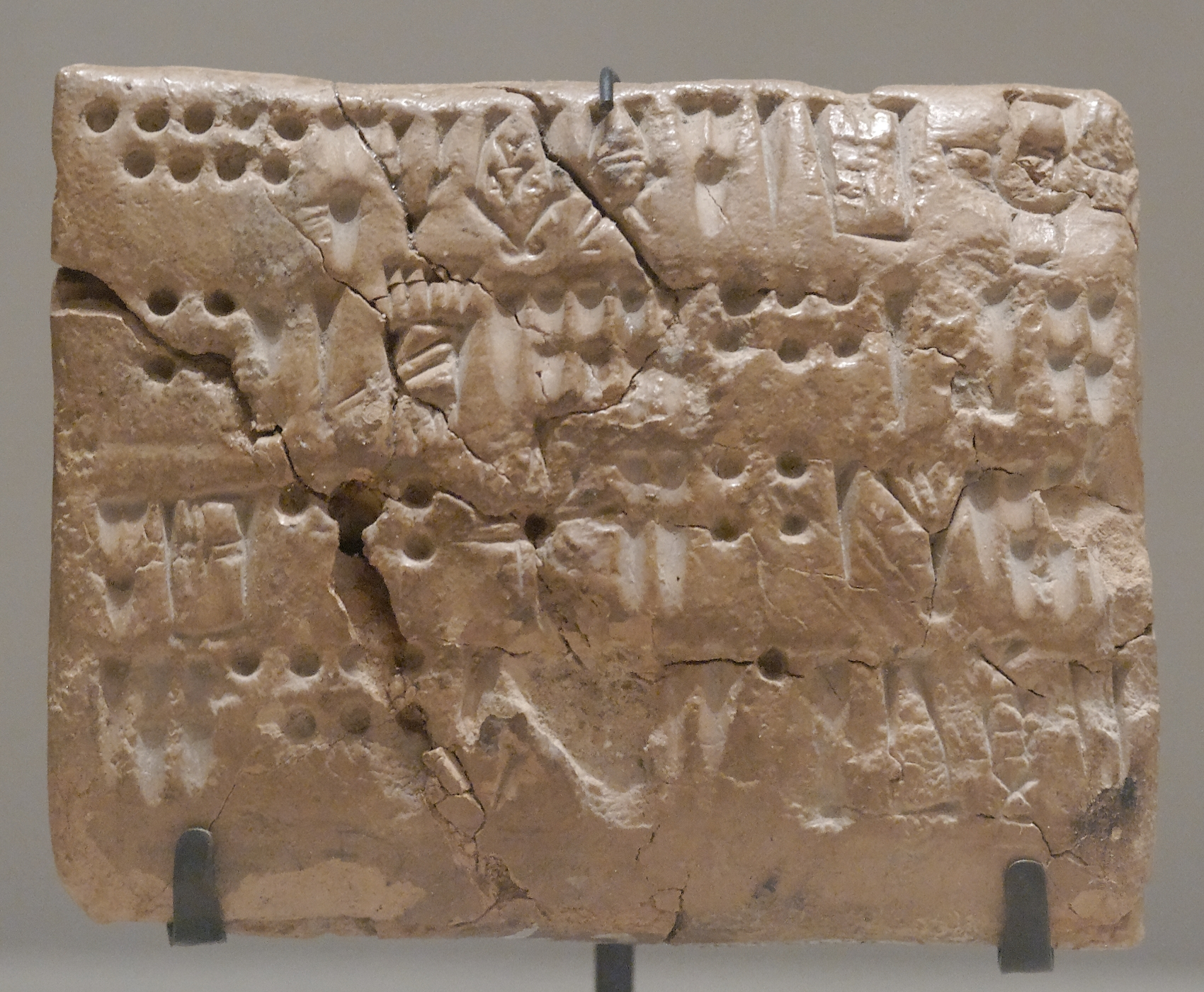
Economic tablet with numeric signs and Proto-Elamite script. Clay accounting tokens, Uruk period. From the Tell of the Acropolis in Susa. Susa III
