= Tepe Sialk =

Archaeological site in Kashan, Isfahan province, Iran

- تپه سیلک (Persian)
- Location within Iran
- 33°58′08″N 51°24′17″E
- Type: Settlement
- Location: Isfahan province, Iran

Site notes
- Excavation dates: 1933-1934, 1937, 1999-2004, 2008-2009
- Archaeologists: Roman Ghirshman, Tania Ghirshman, Sadegh Malek Shahmirzadi, Hassan Fazeli Nashli
- Condition: In ruins

Iran National Heritage List
- Official name: Tappeh Sialk
- Type: Mound
- Designated: 1931
- Reference no.: 38
- Conservation organization: Cultural Heritage, Handicrafts and Tourism Organization of Iran

Tepe Sialk (Persian: تپه سیلک) is a large ancient archaeological site (tepe = 'hill', 'tell') in a suburb of Kashan, Isfahan province, central Iran, close to the Fin Garden. The culture that inhabited this area has been linked to the Zayandeh River Culture.

== History ==
A joint study between Iran's Cultural Heritage Organization, the Louvre, and the Institut Francais de Recherche en Iran also verifies the oldest settlements in Sialk to date to around 6000–5500 BC. The Sialk was built around 3000 BC.

Sialk, and the entire area around it, is thought to have originated as a result of the pristine large water sources nearby that still run today. The Cheshmeh-ye Soleiman (Solomon's Spring) has been bringing water to this area from nearby mountains for thousands of years. The Fin garden, built in its present form in the 17th century, is a popular tourist attraction. It is here that the shahs of the Safavid Empire would spend their vacations away from their capital cities. It is also here that Abu Lu'lu'a, the Persian assassin of the second caliph Umar (r. 634–644), is popularly believed to have been buried. All these remains are located in the same location where Sialk is.

=== Chalcolithic Age ===
The northern mound (Tepe) is the oldest; the occupation dates back to the end of the seventh millennium BC. The mound is composed of two levels: Sialk I (the oldest), and Sialk II.

==== Sialk I ====
In the Early Chalcolithic (c. 8.2-7.4 ka BP), Sialk I is inhabited from around 6000 to 5500 BCE.

Architecture. Sialk I-level architecture is relatively rudimentary.

Pottery. Tombs containing pottery have been uncovered. The ceramic is initially rather rough, then becomes of better quality with the time.

Zagheh archaic painted ware (c. 6000–5500 BC) is found in Tepe Sialk I, sub-levels 1–2. This is the early painted ware that was first excavated at Tepe Zagheh in the Qazvin plain. In sub-periods 3, 4 and 5, the pottery has a clear surface with painted decoration. Stone or bone tools were still used.

==== Sialk II ====
Architecture. The archaeological material found in the buildings of this period testifies to increasing links with the outside world.

Metallurgy. The Sialk II level sees the first appearance of metallurgy.

The southern mound (Tepe) includes the Sialk III and IV levels.

==== Sialk III ====
Sialk III () appears in the southern mound and can be divided into seven sub-periods, corresponds to the fifth millennium and the beginning of the fourth (c. 4000 BC), from the Chalcolithic into the Early Bronze. This period is in continuity with the previous one, and sees the complexity of architecture (molded bricks, use of stone) and crafts, especially metallurgical.

=== Early Bronze Age ===
==== Sialk IV ====
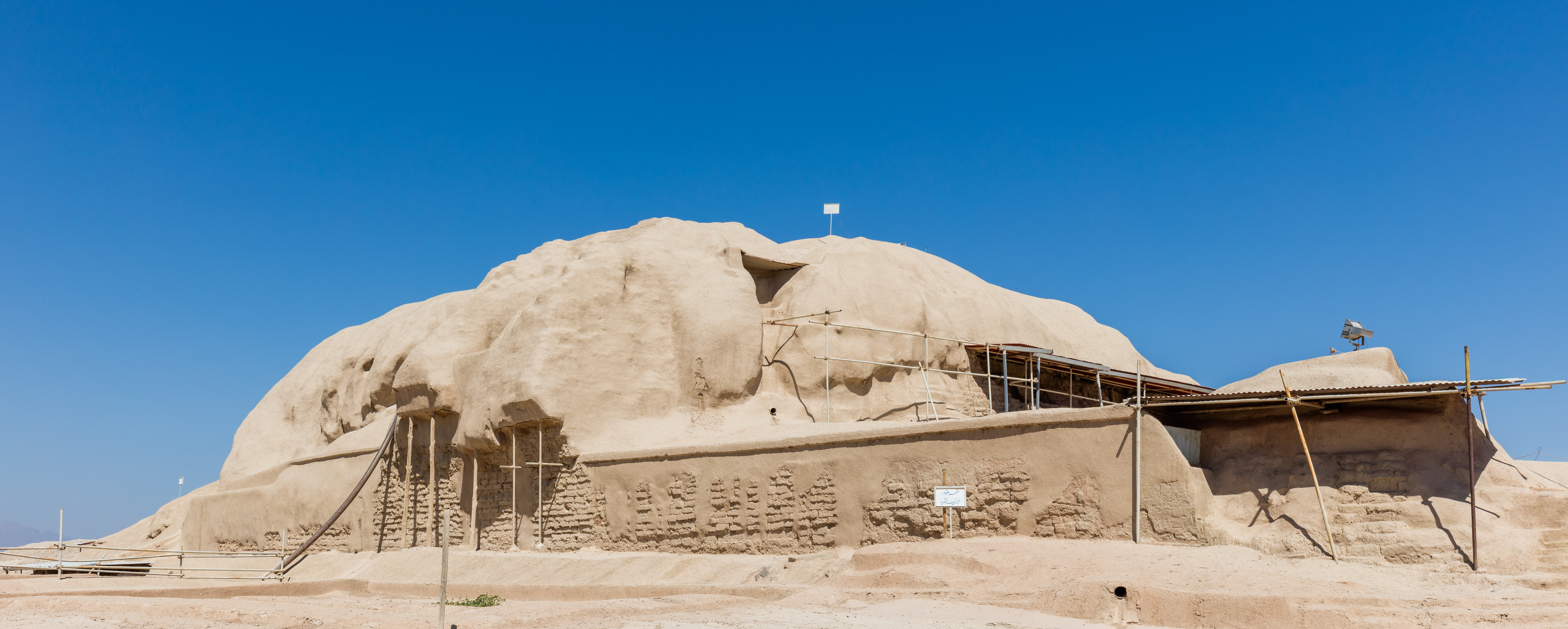
The southern mound of Tepe Sialk, showing the remains of the stepped structure.

Sialk IV level begins in the second half of the fourth millennium. For the oldest sub-periods of the Sialk IV, there are links with the Mesopotamian civilizations of Uruk period (c. EB I) and Jemdet Nasr period (c. EB IIA).

Architecture. The Sialk Ziggurat is the most significant feature of Level IV, a monumental stepped platform built around 3000 BCE - arguably the oldest Ziggurat in the world. Excavations during the Sialk Reconsideration Project (1999–2004) led by Sadegh Malek Shahmirzadi revealed that this structure was built with approximately 1.25 million mud bricks. While traditional Mesopotamian-centric views often overlook early Iranian developments, recent studies using optically stimulated luminescence (OSL) dating have been instrumental in deciphering the chronology of this "Ziggurat," confirming its position as one of the oldest such structures in the ancient world.

Later on, the material is similar to that of Susa III (Proto-Elamite level), so this is where the Proto-Elamite horizon at Sialk is located, as is also evidenced by the discovery here of some Proto-Elamite clay tablets. Early excavations had recovered five Proto-Elamite tablets. Like other outlying sites with Proto-Elamite writing, it was abandoned for time afterward. More recent work has found evidence on the south mound of actual occupation from the Proto-Elamite period.

This period ends with the temporary abandonment of the site at the beginning of the third millennium.

==== Silver metallurgy ====
Evidence demonstrates that Tepe Sialk was an important metal production center in central Iran during the Sialk III and Sialk IV periods. A significant amount of metallurgical remains were found during the excavations in the 1990s and later. This includes large amounts of slag pieces, litharge cakes, and crucibles and moulds.

"Pieces of charcoal found in one of the furnaces in which litharge fragments were found provided a radiocarbon date of 3660-3520 B.C. which introduces them as the oldest so far known fragments of such process in the ancient world."

Other ancient sites in Iran from the same time have also revealed silver production, such as Arisman, and Tappeh Hissar. These sites are attributed to Sialk III-IV and Hissar II-III periods.

==== Cultural development ====
Tepe Ghabristan and Tepe Sialk, as shown on the map of Uruk expansion during the Late Uruk period, ca 3500-3300 BC.

The appearance of Uruk Grey Ware at Tepe Sialk and the related site of Tepe Ghabristan in Qazvin province around 3700 BCE is generally interpreted as representing a break in the local cultural sequence. This is a handmade, chaff tempered and Chaff-Faced Ware, that is also reported from many Chalcolithic period sites in Western Iran, upper Mesopotamia, as well as in Syria, Iraq, and the south-east of Turkey. Most notably, beveled rim bowls, diagnostic pottery of the Uruk culture, were found at Tepe Sialk.

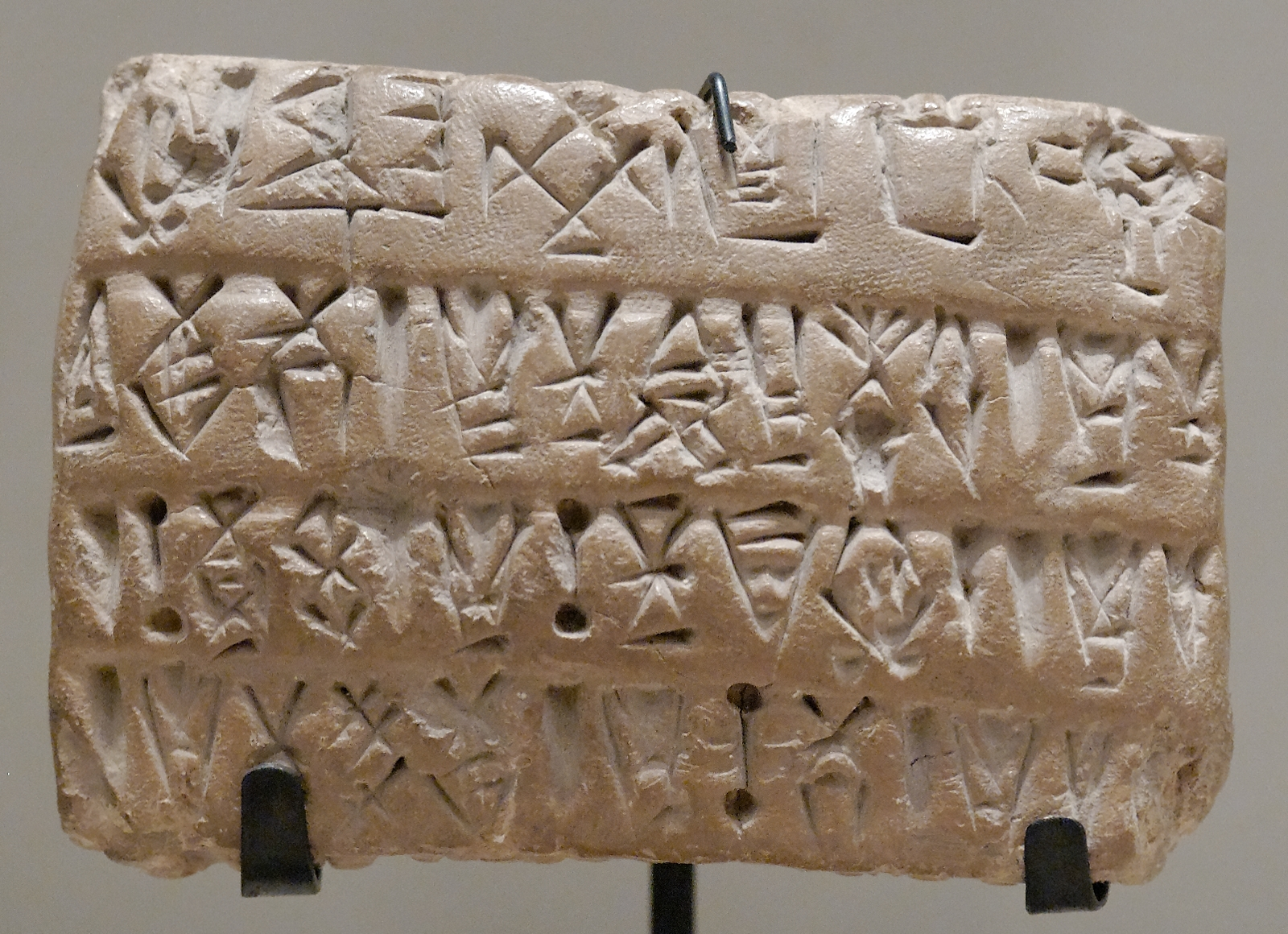
Economic tablet with numeric signs. Proto-Elamite script in clay, Susa, Uruk period (3200 BC to 2700 BC). Department of Oriental Antiquities, Louvre.

=== Middle Bronze Age ===
In the Middle Bronze Age, Sialk V and VI developled. After an abandonment of more than a millennium, the Sialk site was reoccupied in the second half of the second millennium. This last phase of occupation is divided into two periods: Sialk V and Sialk VI. The archaeological material of these two levels has been mostly found in the two necropolises, called necropolis A and necropolis B.

The first represents the Sialk V level. Here are found weapons and other objects in bronze, as well as jewelry, and some iron items. The ceramic is gray-black, or red, sometimes with decorations that consist of geometric patterns, and can be compared to items coming from sites in Gorgan valley (the later levels of Tureng Tepe, and Tepe Hissar).

== Archaeology ==
Tepe Sialk was excavated for three seasons (1933, 1934, and 1937) by a team headed by Roman Ghirshman and his wife Tania Ghirshman. Studies related to the site were conducted by D.E. McCown, Y. Majidzadeh, and P. Amieh.

Excavation was resumed for several seasons between 1999 and 2004 by a team from the University of Pennsylvania and Iran's Cultural Heritage Organization led by Sadegh Malek Shahmirzadi called the Sialk Reconsideration Project.

In 2008 and 2009, an Iranian team led by Hassan Fazeli Nashli and supported by Robin Coningham of the University of Durham have worked at the northern mound finding 6 Late Neolithic burials.

Artifacts from the original dig ended up mostly at the Louvre, while some can be found at the British Museum, the Metropolitan Museum of Art in New York, and the National Museum of Iran and in the hands of private collectors. These artifacts consisted of some very fine painted potteries.

== Images ==
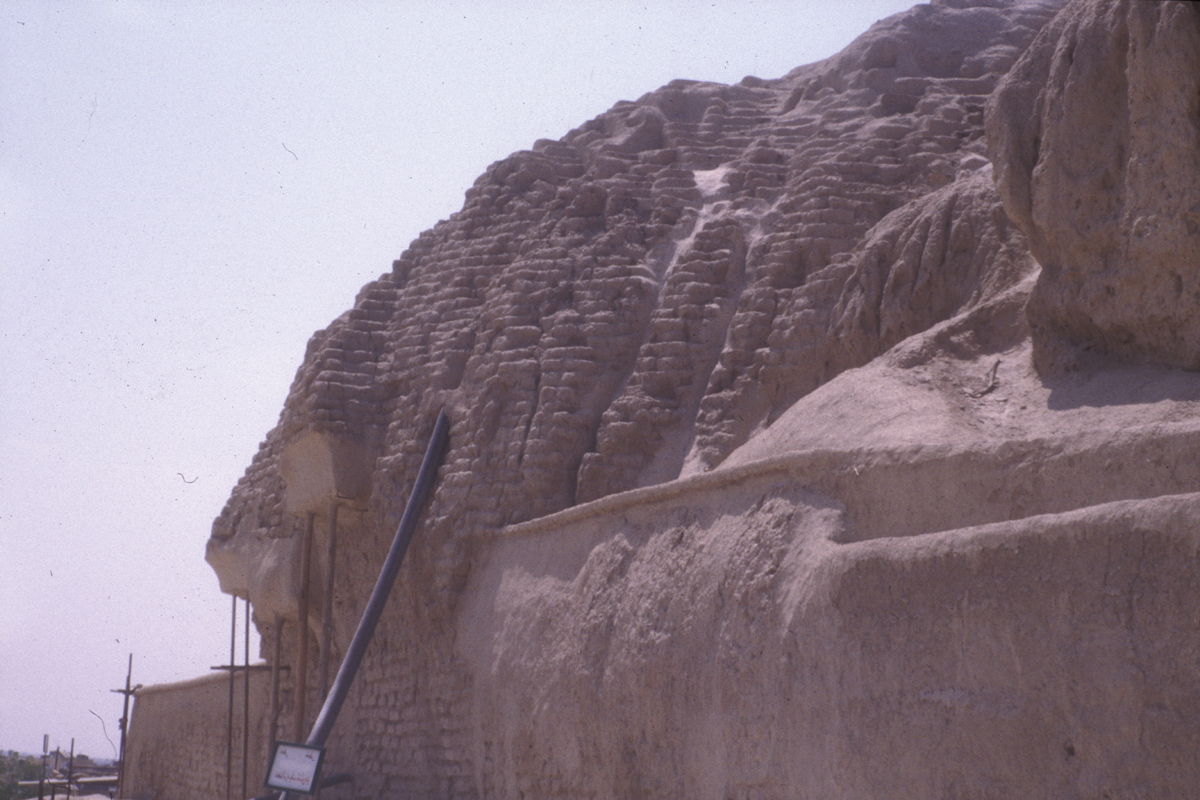
Details of the wall of the second platform of the first tepe

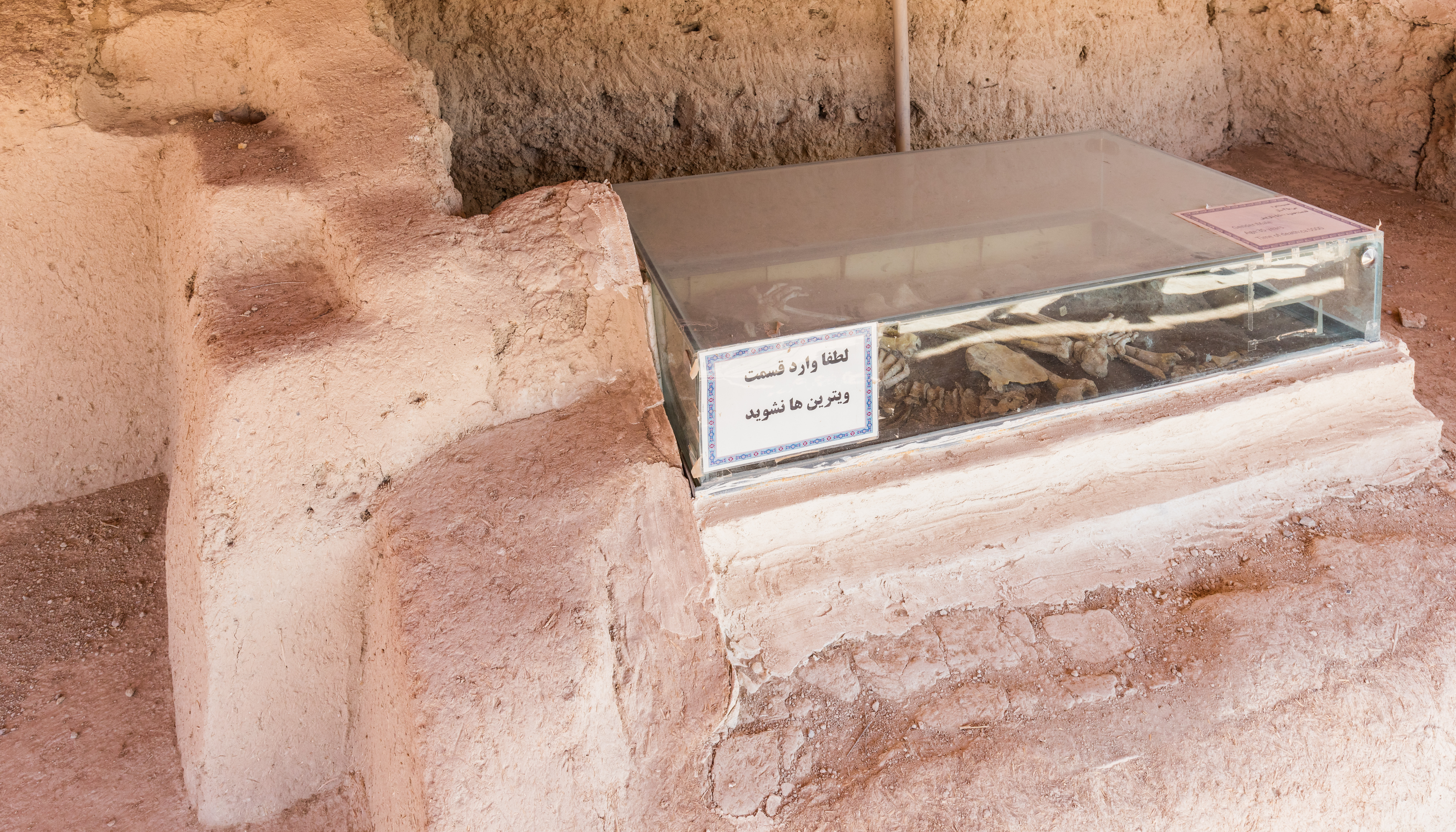
Tomb

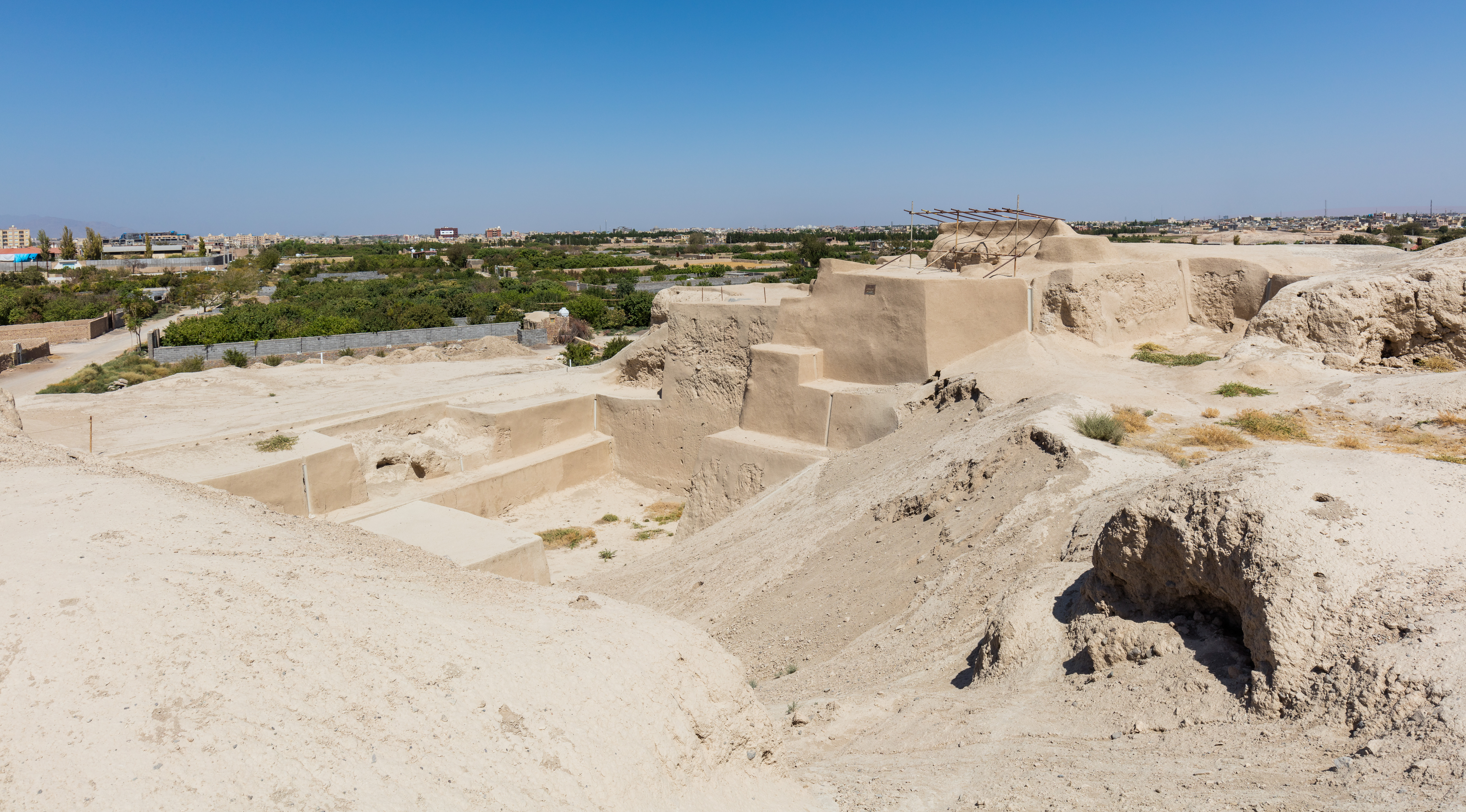
Renovated buildings

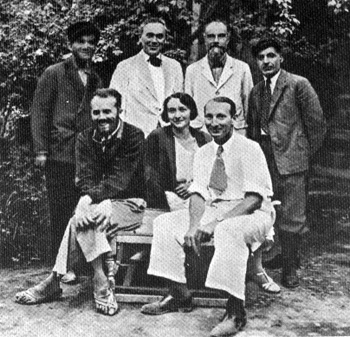
Ghirshman's team in Sialk in 1934; seated from R to L: Roman Ghirshman, Tania Ghirshman, and Dr. Contenau

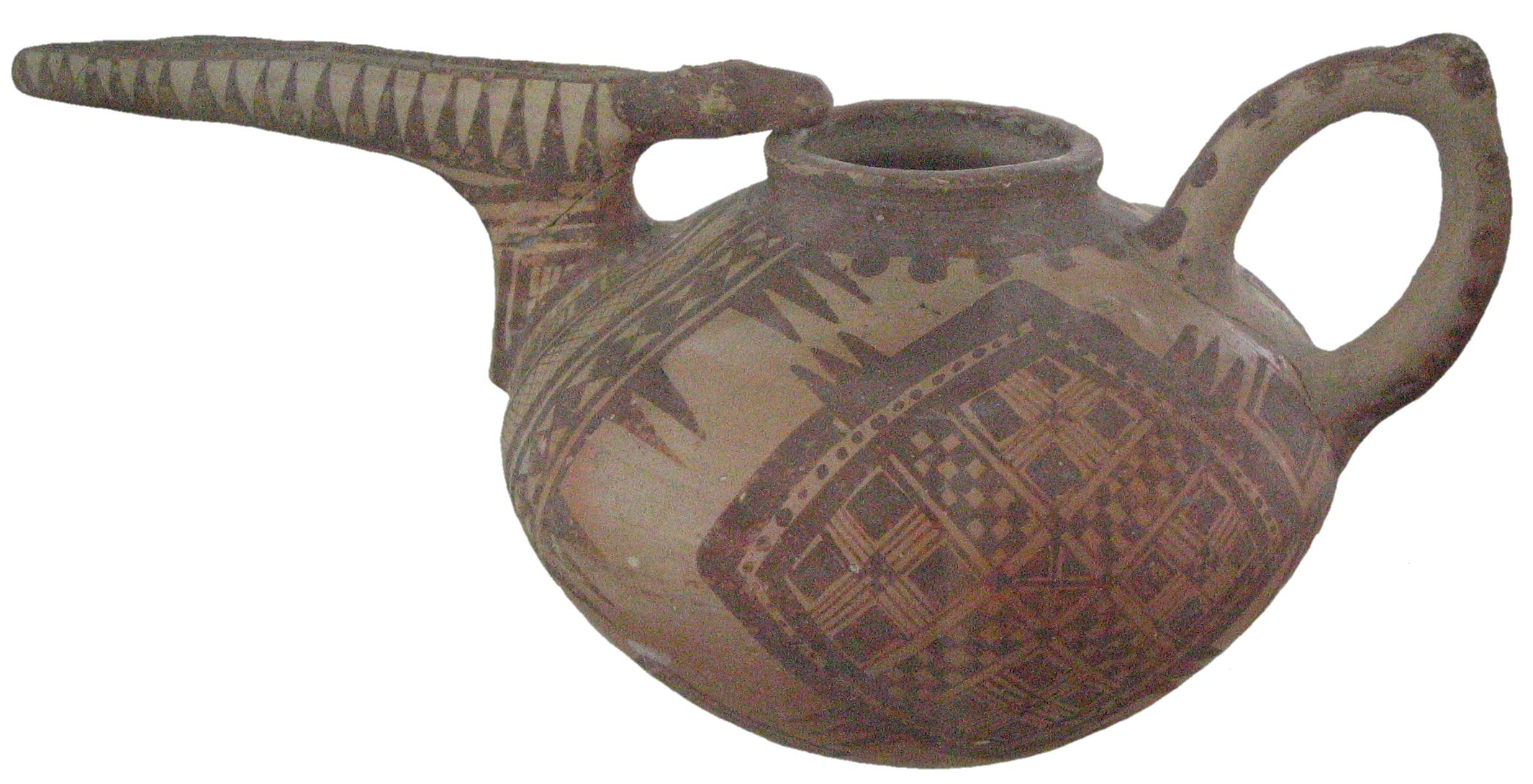
Pottery vessel, Tepe sialk, 1st millennium BC. National Museum of Iran

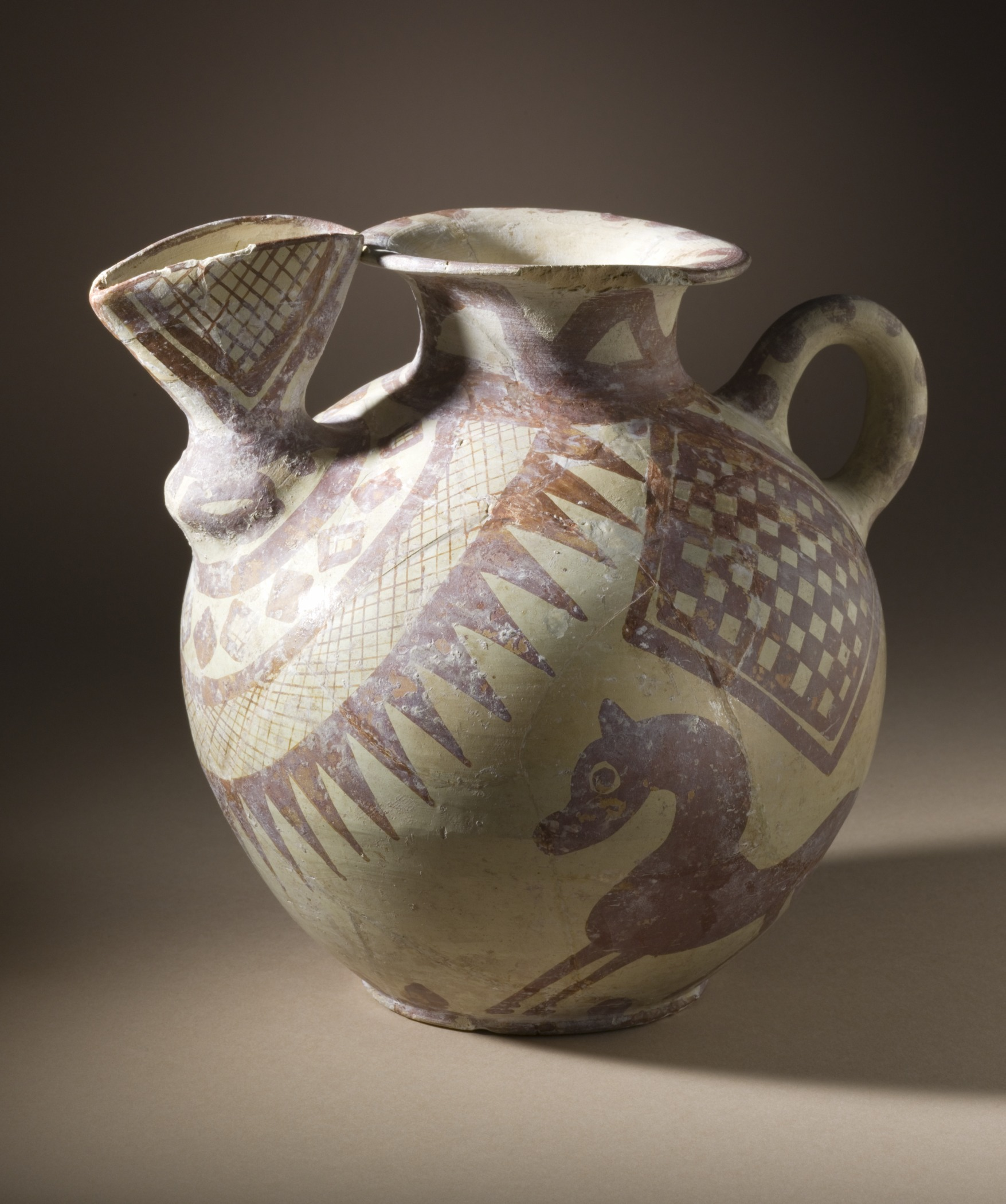
Bridge-spouted jar from Tepe Sialk, circa 800-600 B.C.; buff ware, creamslip, reddish-orange painted decoration. Height: 20 cm. Los Angeles County Museum of Art

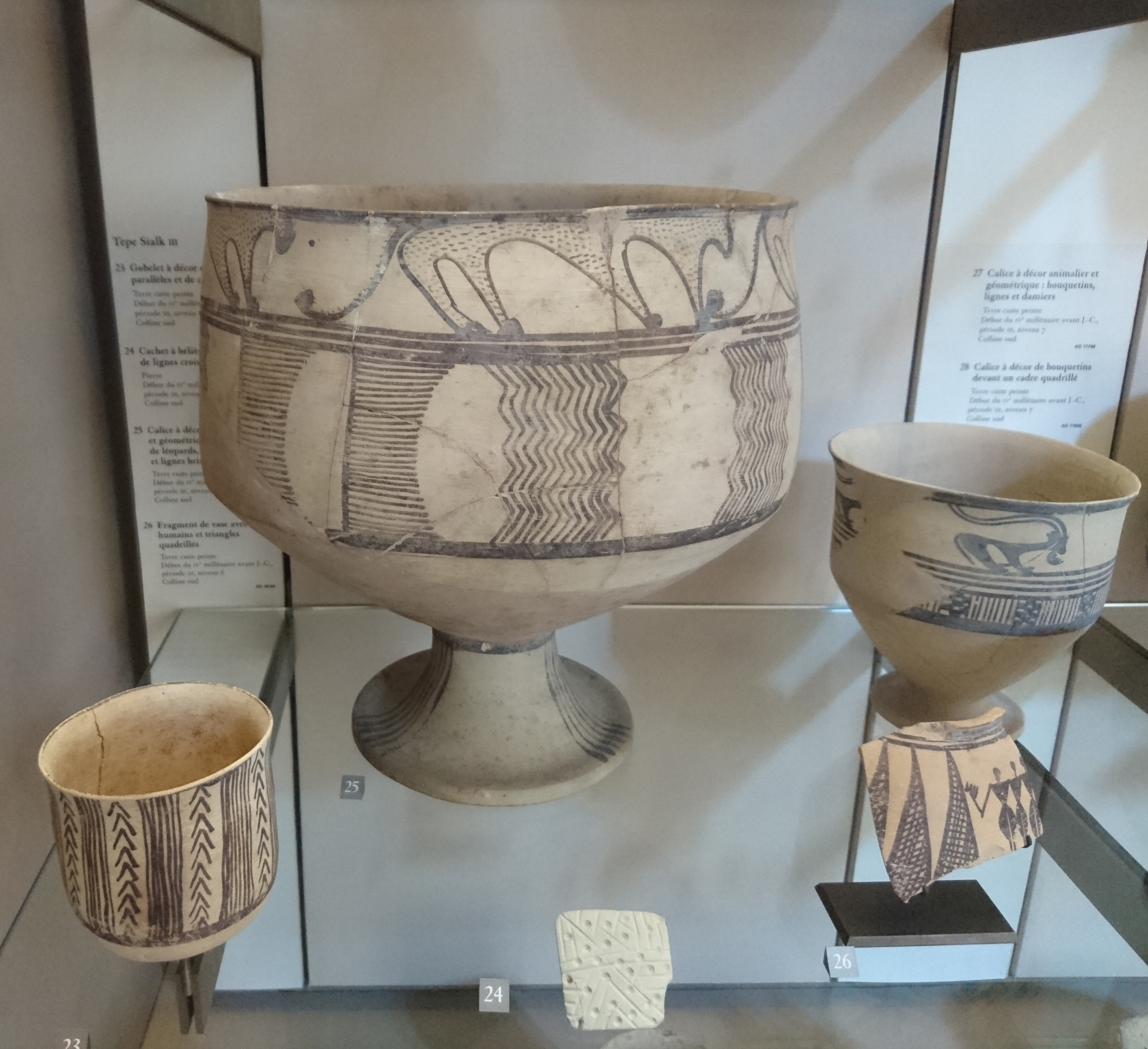
Ceramics from Tepe Sialk. In the centre, Chalice Decorated with Leopards; 4000-3800 BC; Louvre Museum

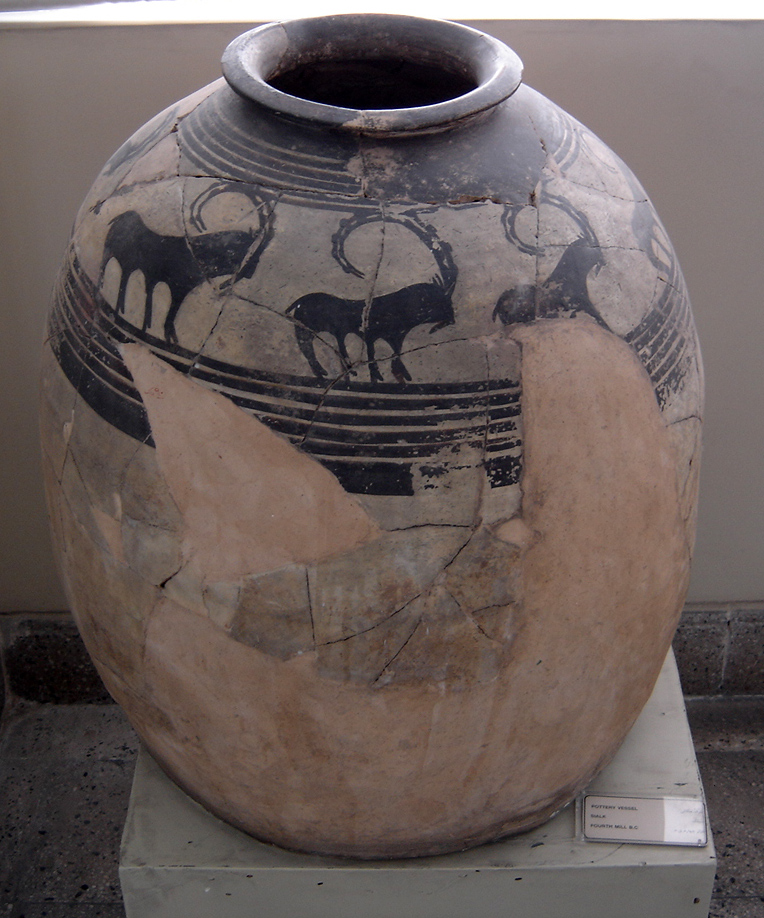
Pottery vessel, 4th millennium BC. The Sialk collection of Tehran's National Museum of Iran.

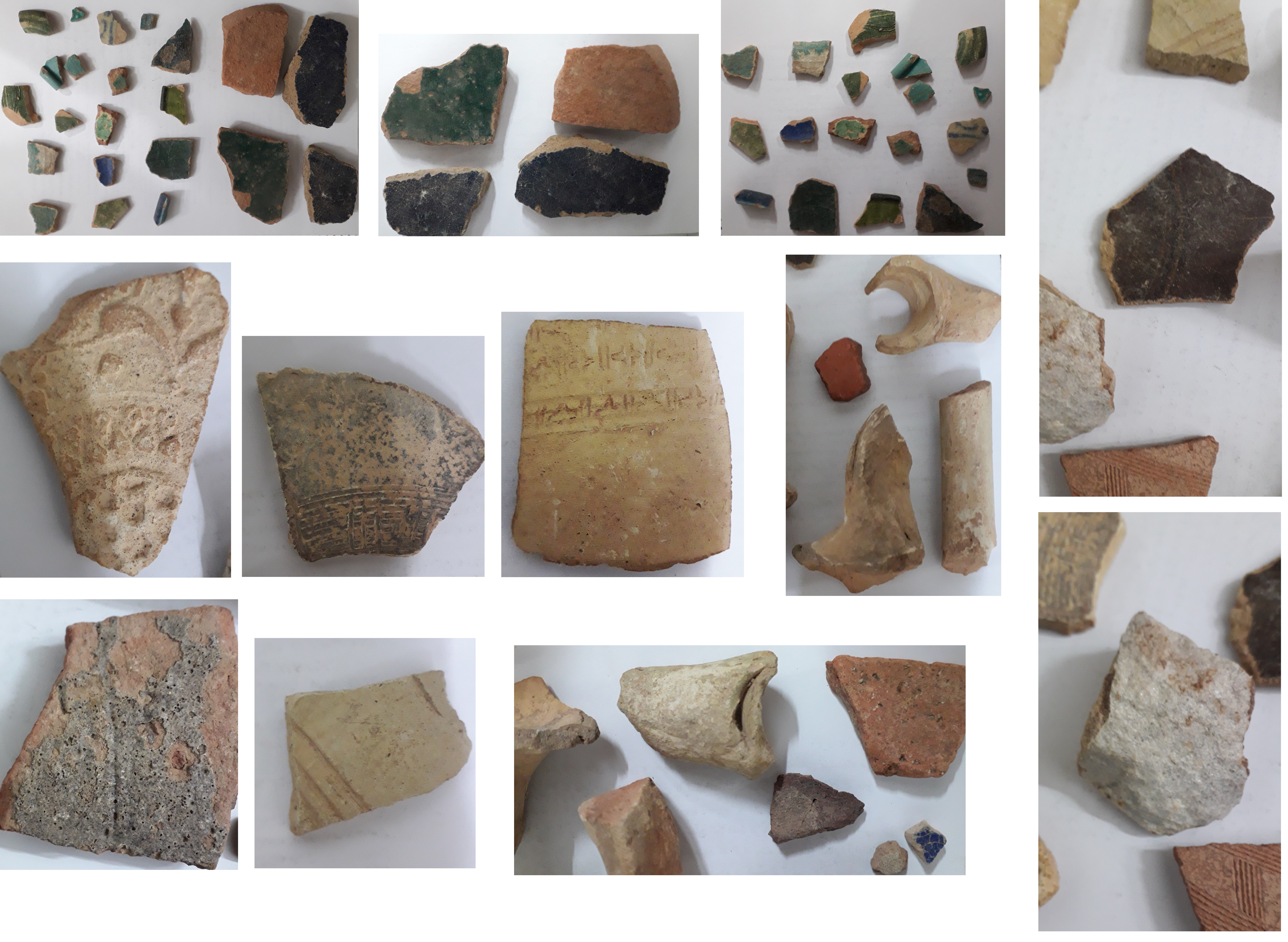
Broken pieces of pottery excavated in Sialk Hill

== See also ==
- Ancient Iranian history
- Cities of the Ancient Near East
- Elamite Empire
- Iranian architecture
- Kashan
- Gerdkooh ancient hill
- Tepe Sofalin
