= James Berger =

James or Jim Berger may refer to:

- James S. Berger (1903–1984), United States Republican State Senator from Pennsylvania
- James O. Berger (born 1950), American statistician
- James M. Berger (born 1968), American biophysicist and biophysical chemist
