= James M. Berger =

American academic and professor of biophysics and biophysical chemistry

- Born: James Michael Berger; 1968 (age 57–58); Albuquerque, New Mexico, U.S.

Academic background
- Education: University of Utah (BS); Harvard University (PhD)
- Doctoral advisor: James C. Wang

Academic work
- Discipline: Biology, chemistry
- Sub-discipline: Biochemistry, biophysical chemistry
- Institutions: University of California, Berkeley; Lawrence Berkeley National Laboratory; Johns Hopkins University

James Michael Berger (born 1968) is an American academic working as a professor of biophysics and biophysical chemistry at Johns Hopkins University School of Medicine, where he is also the co-director of the Cancer Chemical and Structural Biology Program at the Sidney Kimmel Comprehensive Cancer Center and the director of the Johns Hopkins Institute for Basic Biomedical Sciences. His main area of research is the functions of molecular cellular machinery.

== Early life and education ==
Berger was born in 1968 in Albuquerque, New Mexico. Raised in Santa Fe, New Mexico, both of his parents were employed at Los Alamos National Laboratory. In high school, he spent a summer working there, solidifying his interest in biochemistry.

Berger studied biochemistry, with a minor in mathematics, as an undergraduate at the University of Utah. He graduated Phi Beta Kappa and spent summers working at a nuclear research facility. After graduating in 1990, he earned his PhD from Harvard University, where he studied protein crystallography and worked with James C. Wang.

== Career ==
Berger completed a fellowship at the Whitehead Institute, studying topoisomerases from 1995 to 1998. He then became an assistant professor and later professor of biochemistry and molecular biology at the University of California, Berkeley. While employed there, he also worked as a staff research scientist at the Lawrence Berkeley National Laboratory from 1999 to 2013 and served as director of UC Berkeley's Keck Macrolab. In 2013, he moved to Johns Hopkins University.

Berger's lab researches DNA replication and the organization of the enzymes that are involved and the role of ATP in this process.

== Personal life ==
In 1994, he married Marian Feldman, a professor of Near Eastern Studies, while both were graduate students at Harvard University.

== Awards ==
- 2006 - Pfizer Award in Enzyme Chemistry
- 2011 - NAS Award in Molecular Biology - For "elucidating the structures of topoisomerases and helicases and providing insights into the biochemical mechanisms that mediate the replication and transcription of DNA"
- 2013 - Elected to the National Academy of Sciences
- 2018 - Elected to the National Academy of Medicine
