= Ancient Near Eastern seals and sealing practices =

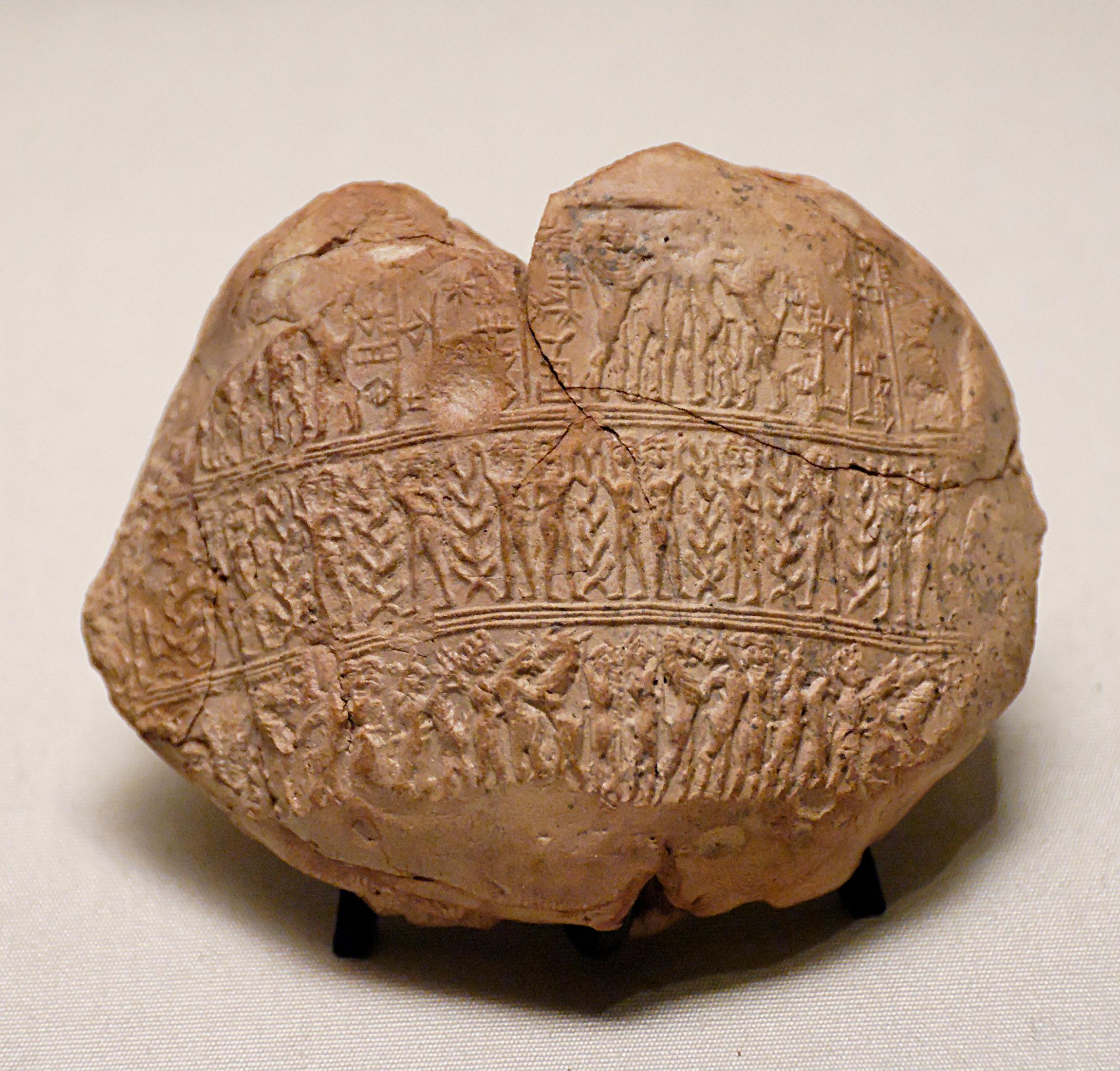
Clay bulla impressed with the seal of Barnamtarra, wife of Lugalanda, ensi (ruler) of Lagash. Early Dynastic III, c. 2400 BC. Found in Telloh (ancient Girsu)

Two main types of seals were used in the Ancient Near East, the stamp seal and the cylinder seal. Stamp seals first appeared in 'administrative' contexts in central and northern Mesopotamia in the seventh millennium and were used exclusively until the fifth millennium. Cylinder seals appeared first around 3600 BC in southern Mesopotamia and south-western Iran (Middle Uruk Period). They gradually replaced stamp seals, becoming the tool of a rising class of bureaucrats in the early stages of state formation. Even though stamp seals were still produced in the third and second millennia, cylinder seals predominated. In the first millennium, stamp seals made a strong comeback and eventually replaced cylinder seals entirely.

== Place names and sites ==
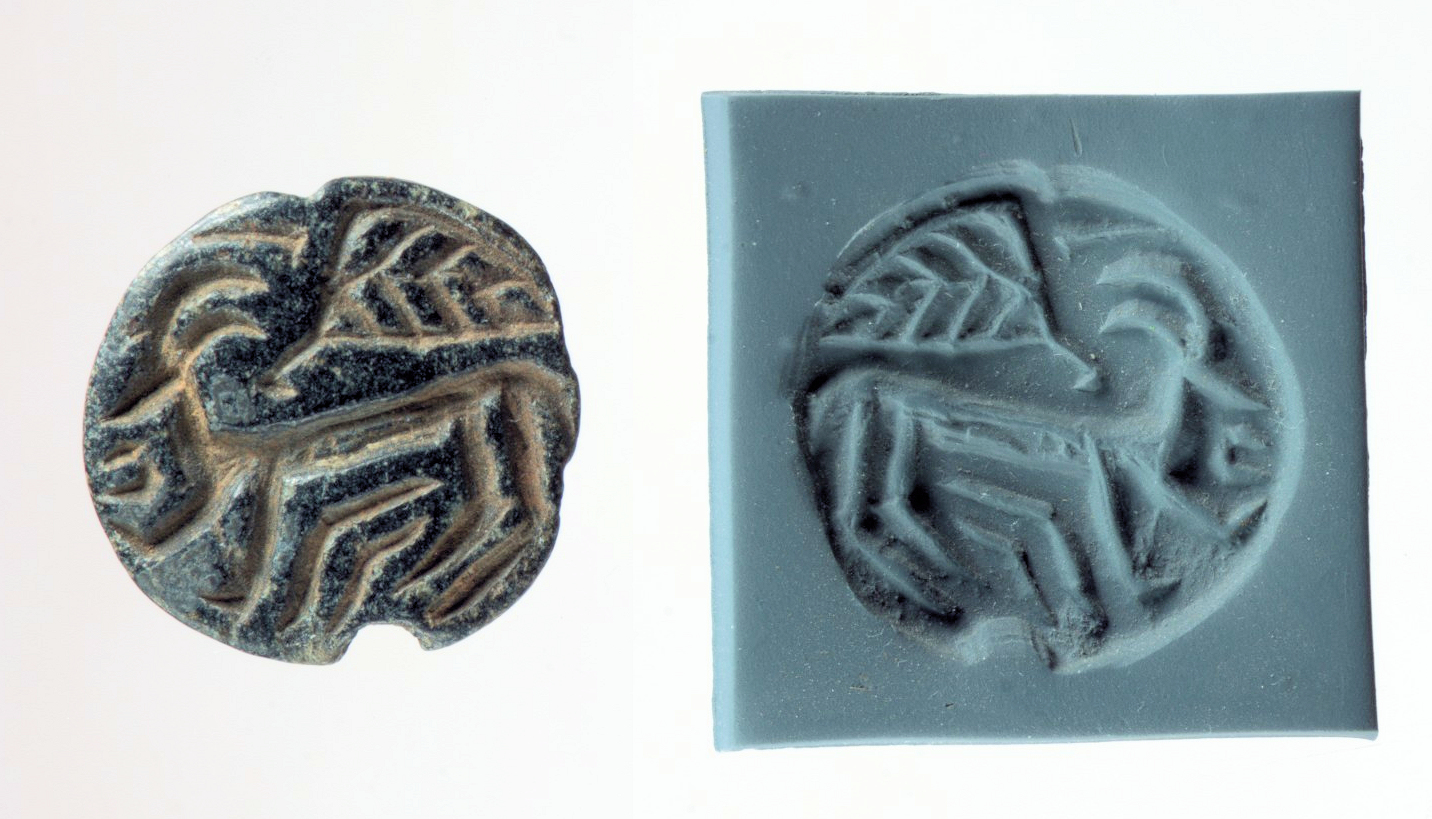
Stamp seal and modern impression. Horned animal and bird, 6th–5th millennium B.C. Northern Syria or Southeastern Anatolia. Ubaid period. Metropolitan Museum of Art

- Eshnunna (T. Asmar),
- Shaduppum (T. Harmal),
- Mari (Tell Hariri),
- Sippar-Yahrurum (T. Abu Habbah),
- Sippar-Amnanum (T. ed-Der),
- Babylon (near al-Hillah),
- Kish (T. Uhaimir),
- Nippur (T. Nuffar),
- Larsa (T. Senkereh),
- Isin (Ishan Bahriyat),
- Kisurra (T. Abu Hatab)
- Ur (T. el-Muqayyar)
- Urkesh (Tell Mozan)

Period/Style	Area	Iconography	Shapes and sizes	Materials and Manufacture	Sealing practices/use	Sites
PPN B	Syria	Geometric patterns	Stamp seals mostly conoid or pyramid shaped, commonly perforated	Baked clay, steatite, jadeite	Impressed multiple times on gypsum slabs; used as amulets	Tell Buqras, Ras Shamra
Hassuna/Samarra	Syria, Iraq, Amuq	Geometric patterns, seldom human figures	Stamp seals mostly conoid or pyramid shaped, tetrahedron form, looped, ridge handled, anthropomorphic, commonly perforated	Baked clay, steatite, jadeite	Impressed, multiple times on gypsum slabs, used as amulets	Tell es-Sawwan, Tell Hassuna, Tell Cudeyde, Yarimtepe I, Ras Shamra
Halaf	Syria, Iraq, Amuq, Turkey	Geometric patterns, Saint Andrews Cross appears, seldom animal figures	Stamp seals mostly conoid or pyramid shaped, double axe or cloverleaf seal, grooved and oval disk seals commonly perforated	Baked clay, steatite, jadeite, chlorite, serpentine, diorite, limestone, rock crystal, sandstone	Container sealings (clay), sealings on gypsum slabs, used as amulets	Tell Halaf, Chagar Bazar, Tell al-Kowm, Tell Sabi Abyad, Arpaciya, Tell Cudeyde, Tepe Gawra
Ubaid	Syria, Iraq	first scenes appear, cultic, erotic, captives, animal and human figures, geometric patterns	stamp seals: tabloid, lentoid and hemispheroid seals, seals with small marginal lug handles, amulet seals with a leaf or wedge, conoid or pyramid shaped, double axe or cloverleaf seals	Baked clay, steatite, jadeite, chlorite, serpentine, diorite, limestone, rock crystal, sandstone	Container and door sealings; used as amulets	Tepe Gawra, Oueili, Eridu, Arpaciya
Early Uruk	Iraq, Syria	Geometric patterns, animal motifs	Circular and rectangular stamp seals; average diameter c. 2.5-3.5 cm, sometimes up to 4 cm	Soft limestones preferred; designs gouged and sometimes drilled	Container sealings (clay)	Uruk, Tepe Gawra, Tell Brak, Susa
Middle Uruk	Iraq, Iran, Syria	Cylinder seals: "baggy style", animal rows, animal combat, daily life scenes, 'nude hero' mastering animals; stamp seals: animals antithetically arranged, geometric designs	Cylinder seals: tall, large diameter; stamp seals: circular, rectangular, zoomorphic, kidney shaped; average diameter c. 3-3.5 cm	Cylinder and stamp seals: soft bright limestones, gypsum. increasing use of the drill, deeply cut designs smoothened with a graver	Container sealings, door sealings, jar stoppers, sealed hollow clay balls; sometimes counter-sealing with stamp seals, sometimes multiple impressions of stamp seals	Uruk, Tello, Nippur, Niniveh, Yorgan Tepe (Nuzi), Tell Brak, Tell Qraya, Tell Hamoukar, Tell Sheikh Hassan, Susa, Sharafabad, Choga Mish
Late Uruk	Iraq, Iran, Syria, Turkey	Cylinder seals: Geometric designs, files of animals, ladder-pattern, "master of the animals", monsters, intertwined snakes, pigtailed figures, architecture, heraldic scenes; activities, (captives & violence; hunting; herding; procession & cultic scenes; depictions of the 'priest king'); stamp seals: geometric designs, animals	Cylinder seals: tall and large (two groups; one with heights ranging from 4–6 cm, diameters between 3–5 cm; the other with average height and diameter c. 2 cm); stamp seals: circular, zoomorphic, kidney shaped; average diameter 2.5 cm	Soft, bright limestones, gypsum, steatite, rarely lapis lazuli, shell and ivory; designs cut and drilled; images rather plastic, naturalistic, deeply cut designs; sometimes axial perforation of the cylinders occurs; sometimes cylinder seals are provided with a loop, either cut in one piece with the cylinder or attached to it	Container sealings, door sealings, jar stoppers; sealings on tablets, hollow clay balls, bullae, labels, disks. Stamp seals sometimes impressed multiple times; Cylinder Seal rolled across the tablets and their edges first, then inscribed; when applied on hollow clay balls, sometimes the whole surface is covered with different sealings	Uruk, Ur, Jemdet Nasr, Habuba Kabira-South, Tall Qannas, Jebel Aruda, Tall Sheikh Hassan, Tall Brak, Tall Hamoukar, Hacınebi Tepe, Arslantepe, Hassek Höyük, Susa, Choga Mish, Tepe Sharafabad, Godin Tepe, Tal-i Malyan
Jemdet Nasr	Iraq, Iran, Syria	Cylinder seals: daily life, production processes (weaving), pig-tailed figures, schematic designs (files of animals, e.g. spiders and scorpions, eye pattern, fish pattern)	Example	Colored limestones and dark, hard stones preferred; steatite, serpentine, schist; extensive use of the drill	Container sealings; sealings on tablets, bullae	Jemdet Nasr, Uruk, Ur,
Proto-Elamite	Iran	Cylinder seals: 'animals acting as humans', Rearing animals, animal files, floral designs, monsters	Tall, large cylinders	darker stones preferred; limestones, steatite, chlorite, schist, bituminous stone & figures heavily proportioned, internal surfaces cut with a pointed graver	Container sealings, jar stoppers, door sealings; sealing of tablets, hollow clay balls, bullae	Susa, Tal-i Malyan, Tepe Giyan, Tepe Sialk, Godin Tepe, Tal-i Ghazir
Early Dynastic I	Example	Example	Example	Example	Example	Example
Early Dynastic II	Example	Example	Example	Example	Example	Example
Early Dynastic IIIa	Example	Example	Example	Example	Example	Example
Early Dynastic IIIb	Example	Example	Example	Example	Example	Example
Akkadian	Iraq, Syria	Contest scenes, mythological scenes (Sun God and Water God), worship scenes, banquet scenes, introduction scenes, procession scenes	Cylinder seals with concave sides (flared ends). Large (3–4 cm tall)	Majority serpentine; also diorite, greenstone, jasper, lapis lazuli and rock crystal	Container sealings, (new package sealings), door sealings, bulla-labels	Tell Brak, Nippur, Tell Asmar, Ur, Khafaje, Tello (Girsu), Tell Mozan
Ur III	Iraq	Predominantly presentation scenes in many variations; some contest, procession and ritual scenes	Small cylinder seals rarely more than 2.8 cm tall	Majority chlorite; also serpentine, steatite, limestone, hematite and lapis lazuli	Majority tablet sealings; door sealings and container sealings still occur	Tello (Girsu), Nippur, Tell Asmar (Eshnunna), Ur, Lagash, Umma, Drehem
Isin-Larsa	Iraq, Syria	Contest scenes, procession scenes. Presentation scenes; libation or animal offerings. New motifs include male or deity holding a mace, deity with scimitar, and nude female. Commonly mixture of elements from different scenes.	Cylinder seals: straight. Average height: 2.5-3.0 cm; "burgul" seals with no iconography used alongside common cylinder seals at certain sites (Eshnunna, Kish, Marad, Nippur, Isin, Kisurra, and Ur).	Dark hard stones preferred, mainly haematite; also Goethite, serpentine, jasper, agate, rock crystal, lapis lazuli (often reused seals and scrap material), soft limestones and chlorite, and terracotta. More seldom shell, gypsum, "greenstone", obsidian, carnelian, mudstone, and basalt. Drilling and filing with hand-held tools. Use of emery as abrasive. Tool traces are masked by further engraving, micro-chipping and polishing.	Container sealings and door sealings. Also tablet and envelope sealings (letters, legal and administrative documents) and occasionally bullae; multiple impressions of the same or different seals	Eshnunna, Shaduppum, Sippar-Yahrurum, Sippar-Amnanum, Kish, Nippur, Larsa, Isin, Kisurra, and Ur, Mari (T. Hariri)
Old Babylonian	Iraq	Contest scenes, presentation scenes, figure holding a mace, deity with scimitar, and nude female. Less introduction scenes. Commonly mixture of elements from different scenes. Two figures flanking the inscription on Late Old Babylonian seals.	Cylinder seals: straight, average height: 2.5-3.0 cm; "burgul" seals not attested after the 18th century BC.	Haematite mostly; magnetite around the 18th century; the rest same materials as Isin-Larsa. Introduction of bow-driven cutting wheels and drills during the mid-18th century BC; now unmasked drill holes, filing- and wheel marks.	Container sealings and door sealings. Also tablet and envelope sealings (letters, legal and administrative documents); multiple impressions of the same or different seals	Sippar-Yahrurum, Sippar-Amnanum, Babylon, Kish, Nippur, Larsa, Isin, Kisurra, and Ur
Old Assyrian	Iraq, Syria, Anatolia	Introduction- and presentation scenes, chariots drawn by equids, bulls on offering tables, procession- and contest scenes, water god.	Cylinder seals: straight. Average height: 1.8-2.8 cm.	Haematite most common, also magnetite, lapis lazuli, limestone, jasper, and basalt. Execution individual, "flat, linear style"of carving similar to Isin-Larsa glyptic from the Diyala area. Figures with fork-like hands	Container sealings, door- and window sealings. Also tablet and envelope sealings (letters and legal documents), bullae and triangular tags; multiple impressions of the same or different seals	Assur (Qal’at Sherqat), Ninveh, Nuzi (Yorghantepe), Shubat-Enlil (T. Leilan), Kanesh (Kültepe), Acemhöyük, Alişar, and Boğazköy.
Mittani Common Style	Iraq, Syria, Cyprus, Levant, Greece, Iran, Anatolia, Georgia, Armenia, the Persian Gulf	Simple ritual scenes where figures flank a tree, rows of animals and humans.	Cylinder seals: straight; height varies.	Compositional, sintered quartz (frit) and faience. A few of chert and hematite	Most seals stem from burials.	Malikh, Hasanlu, Beth Shan, Byblos, Kamid el-Loz, Mohammed 'Arab, Nuzi, Hazor, Megiddo, Alalakh, Tell Kazel, Tell Al-hamidiya, Dhekelia, Tell Billa, Assur, Lchashen, Sapar-Kharaba, Tell Brak
Mittani Elaborate Style	Iraq, Syria, Greece, Levant	Ritual scenes, drinking and offering scenes, animal rows. Some inscribed	Cylinder seals	Hematite, chalcedony, carnelian, agate, chert, limestone; colourful. Use of the drill on hard stones	Tablet and envelope impressions	Nuzi, Alalakh, Tell Brak
First Kassite Style	Iraq, Iran	Two figure ritual scenes. Bordered crosses, rosettes, animals; gazelles, frogs, birds, dogs and fish. Long inscriptions.	Small and uniform size	Hard stones; chalcedony, agate	Example	Nuzi, Nippur, Nimrud
Pseudo-Kassite Style	Iraq, Iran, The Persian Gulf	More linear than First Kassite. Inscriptions not length of whole seal and without real meaning (only for show). Double lines and hatched bands common. Monsters and birds.	Example	Soft composite materials; sintered quartz (frit) and glass.	Example	Nippur, Choza Zanbil, Susa, Subeidi, Failaka
Second Kassite Style	Iraq	Chthonic god cycle including natural and cosmic elements. Sacred tree flanked by living creatures; human or animal	Cylinder seals	Hard stones (colourful); chalcedony, agate, lapis lazuli. Glass. With golden caps	Tablet sealings	Thebes, Nippur, Ur, Subeidi, Assur, Aqar Quf
Third Kassite Style/Isin II Style	Iraq	Animals or monster scenes, a few involving humans. marru. Linear tendency	Cylinder seals	Soft stones and quartz. Gold caps flourish. Drill used less than in Second Kassite seals.	Tablet and envelope sealings	Ur, Uruk, Nippur, Abu Hatab, Luristan
Middle Assyrian	Iraq, Syria	Contest scenes, animal scenes (horse and winged bull appear), chariot scenes, hunting with archer, temples, antithetically arranged pairs of figures including the winged "griffin-demon", "sacred-tree"; sometimes inscription included; also schematic, linear depictions	Straight cylinder seals; average diameter c. 1.6 cm, average height ranging between 3.2-4.7 cm	Agate, limestone, quartz, jasper, carnelian, lapis-lazuli, talc, frit; either cutting of high quality or - for the cut-style - cursory engraving with extensive use of the cutting wheel	Tablet and envelope sealings; container and door sealings	Assur, Tell Sheikh Hamad (Dur-Katlimmu), Tell Mohammed ‘Arab, Tell Fakhariya, Tell Sabi Abyad, Tell Billa, Tell al-Rimah
Neo-Assyrian	Iraq, Syria	Royal worship, king with bow and cup, devotional scenes, banquet scenes, contest scenes, ritual scenes, animal scenes, hunting scenes. Figures flanking a tree. The "siege"	Cylinder and stamp seals	Manufactured in 4 styles; linear (soft materials; steatite, serpentine and sintered quartz (frit)), modeled (chalcedony), cut (hard and soft materials), drilled (chalcedony, agate)	Container sealings. Jar stoppers. Door sealings. Bullae. Tablet sealings	Nimrud, Nineve, Assur, Tell Sheikh Hamad (Dur-Katlimmu)
Neo-Babylonian	Example	Example	Example	Example	Example	Example
