= Stamp seal =

Common seal die, used to impress an image into soft material

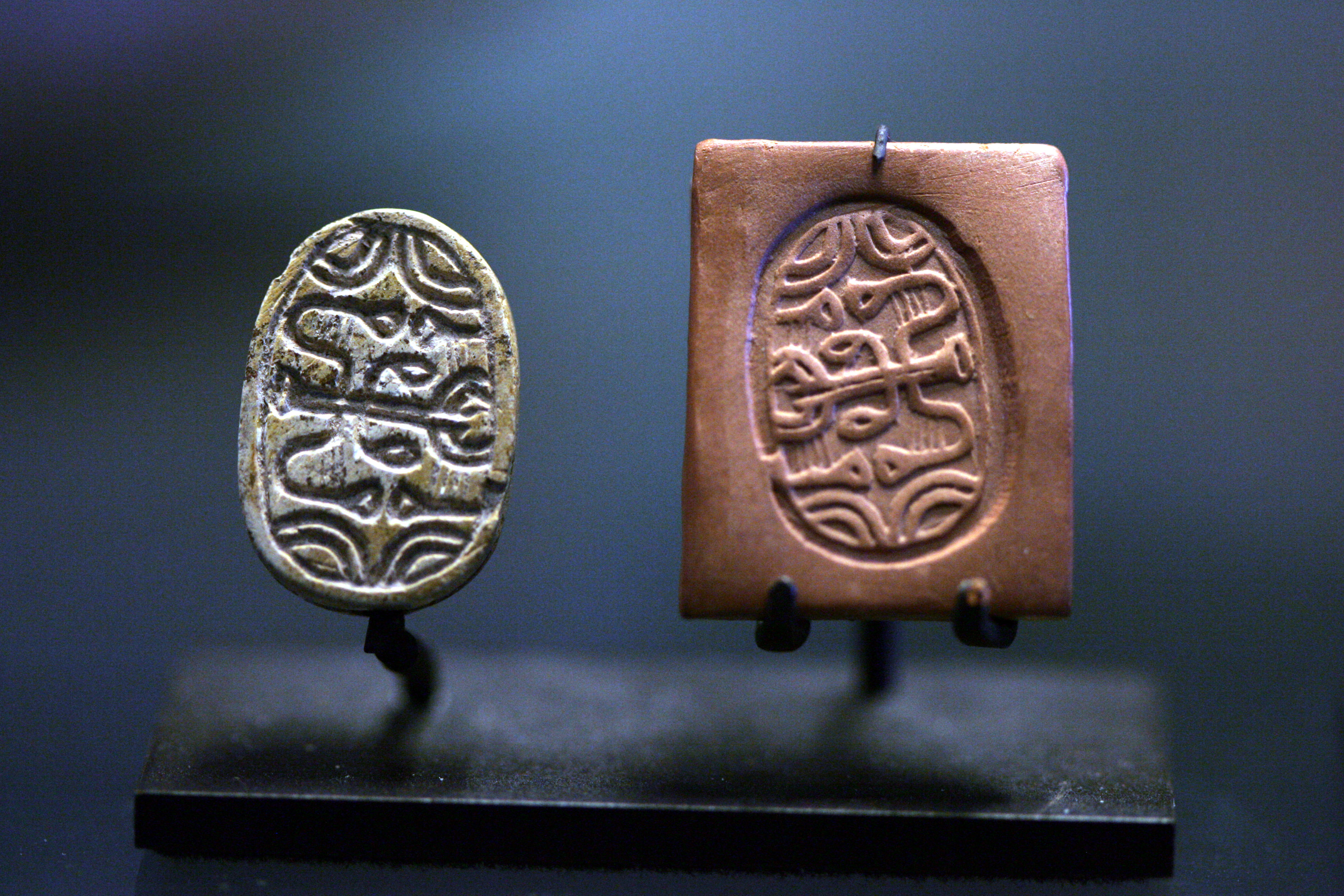
A stamp seal and its impression. The impression rotated clockwise 90 degrees probably yields a version of the Tree of Life-(see Urartian art photos).

The stamp seal (also impression seal) is a common seal die, frequently carved from stone, known at least since the 6th millennium BC (Halaf culture) and probably earlier. The dies were used to impress their picture or inscription into soft, prepared clay and sometimes in sealing wax.

The oldest stamp seals were button-shaped objects with primitive ornamental forms chiseled onto them. The stamp seals were replaced in the 4th millennium BC by cylinder seals that had to be rolled over the soft clay to leave an imprint. From the 12th century BC the previous designs were largely abandoned in favor of amphora stamps. Romans introduced their signaculum around the first century BC; Byzantine maintained the tradition in their commercial stamps.

In antiquity the stamp seals were common, largely because they served to authenticate legal documents, such as tax receipts, contracts, wills and decrees.

== Indus stamp-seal ==
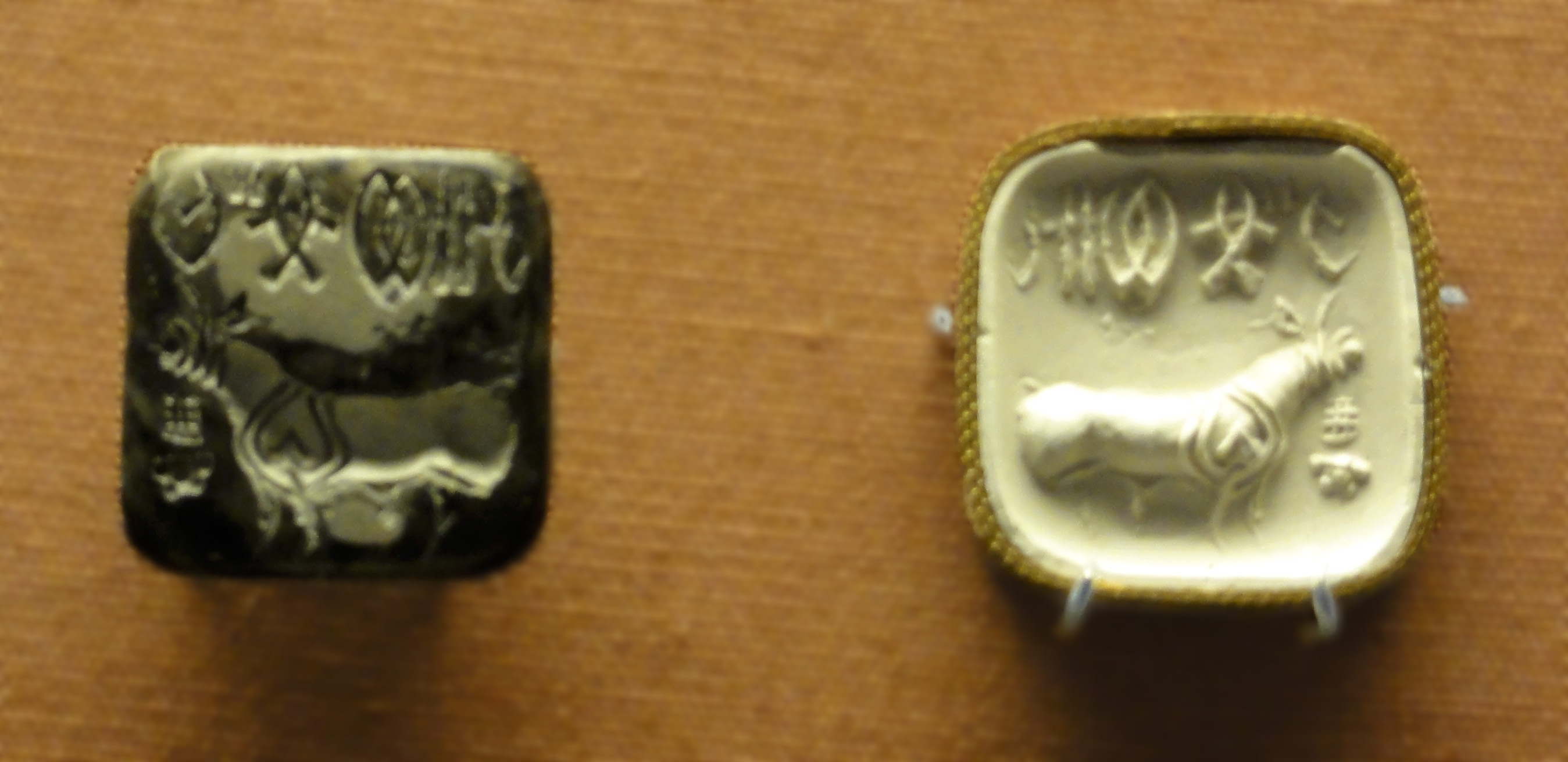
Indus seal, (with modern impression); from ca. mid- to late-3rd millennium BC.(?)

The Indus stamp-seals probably had a different function from the stamp seals of the Minoan civilization, as they typically have script characters, with still undeciphered associations.

== Gallery ==
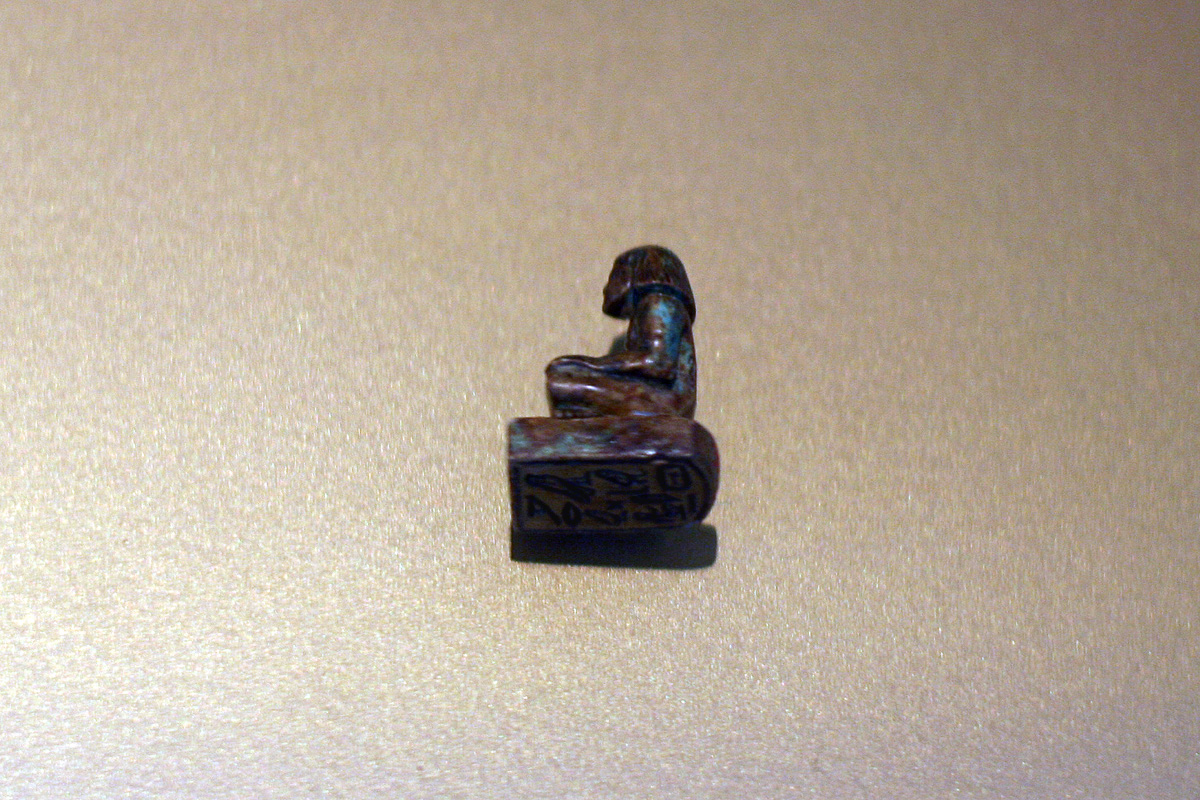
Stamp seal of an Egyptian named:
Meru-the Answerer of Horus
(Brooklyn Museum)

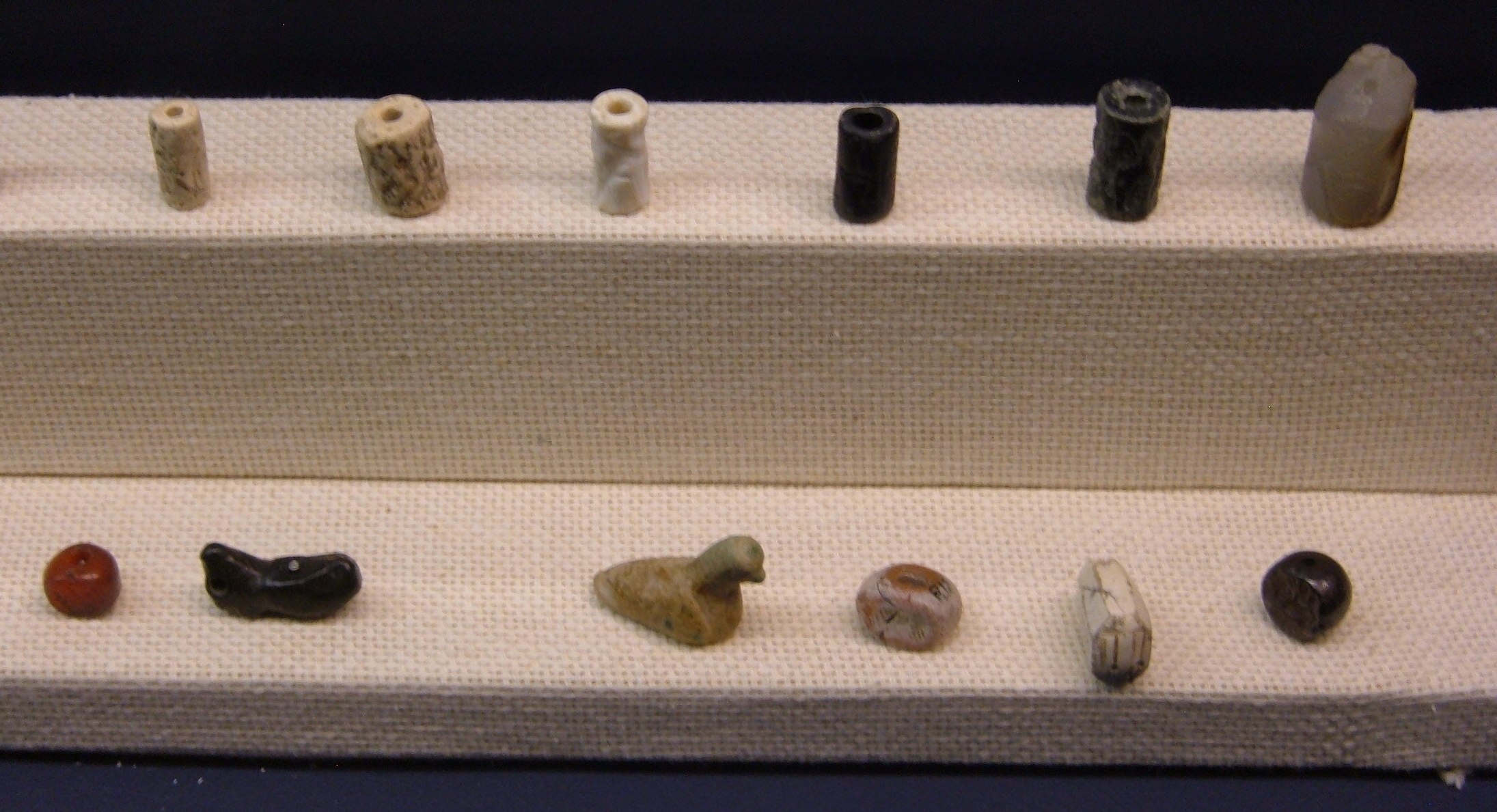
Stamp seals (bottom row), cylinder seals (top row)

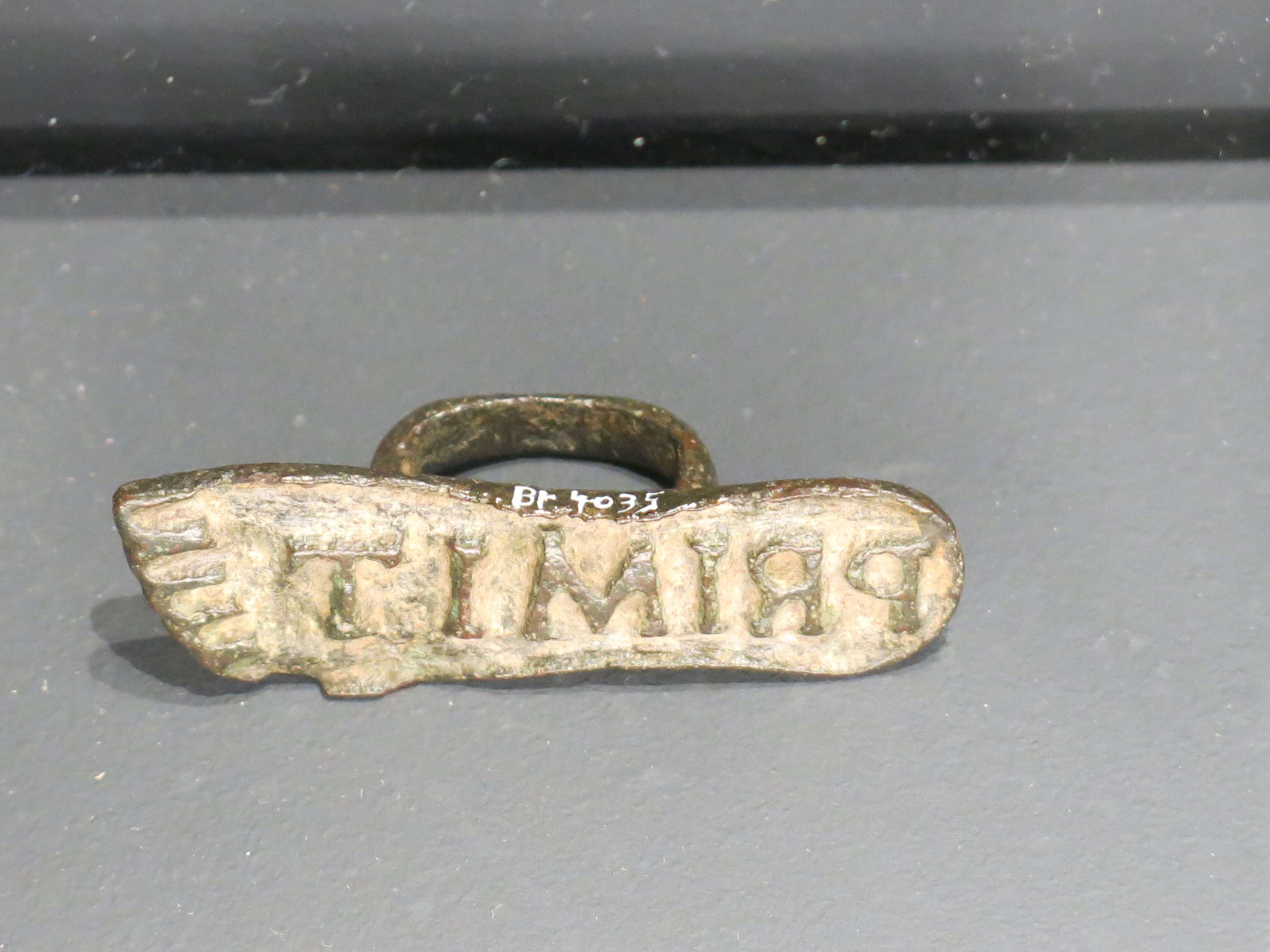
Signaculum PRIMIT ("first")

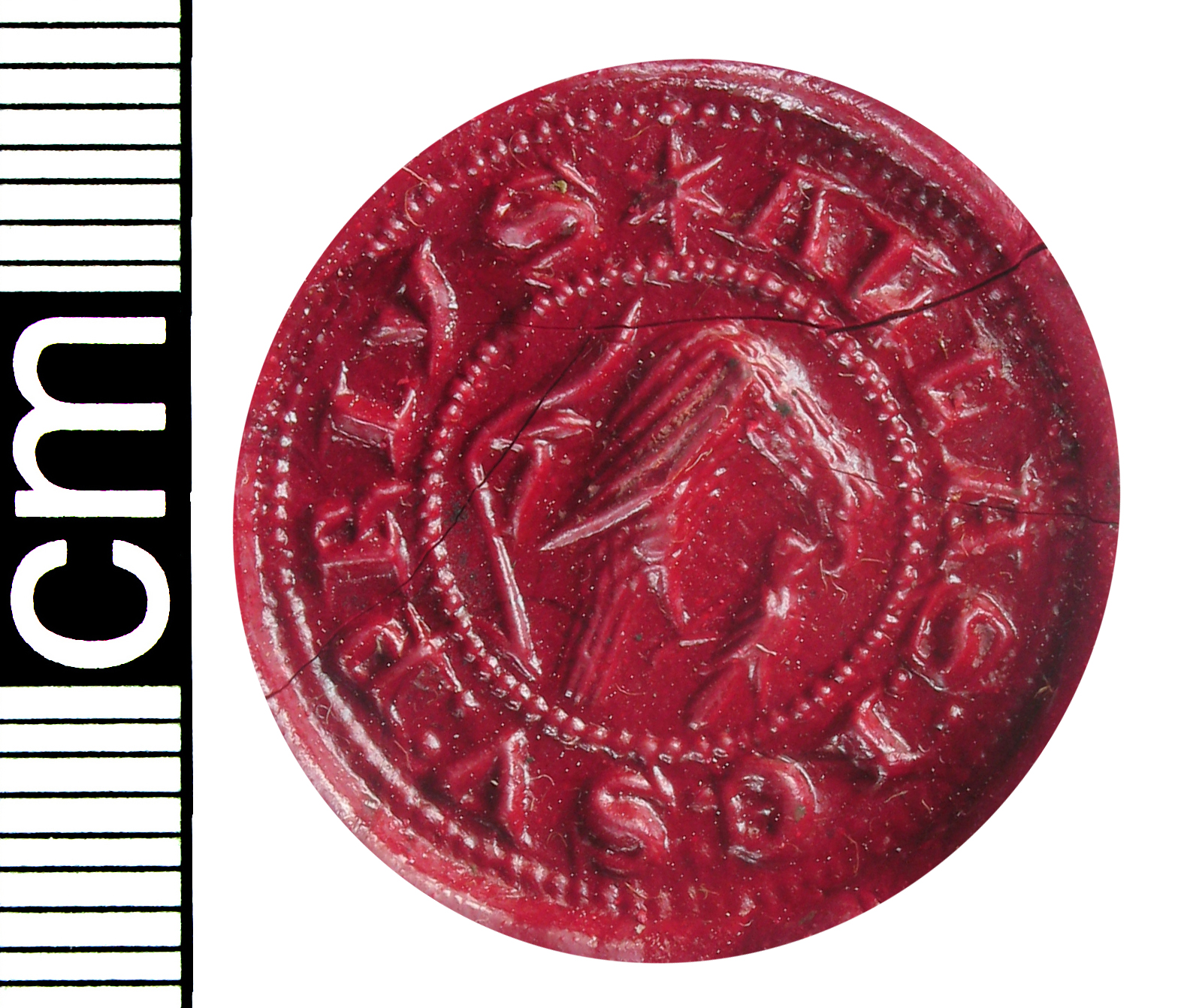
An impression of a cast copper-alloy seal matrix of medieval date (14th century AD)

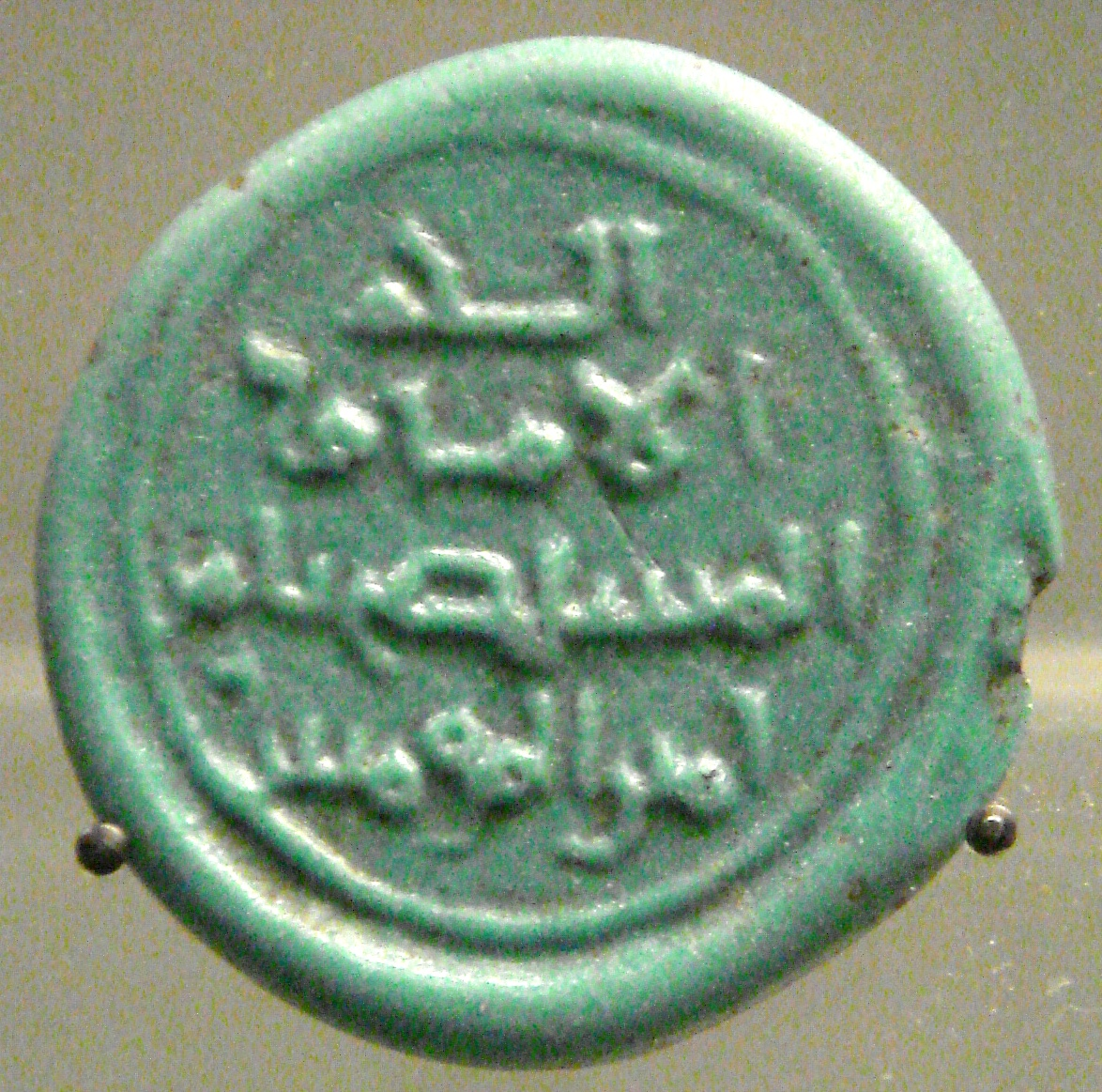
Turquoise glass stamp of 12th-century Abbasid caliph al-Mustadi (r. 1170–1180).

== See also ==
- Ancient Near Eastern seals and sealing practices
- Bulla (seal)
- Indus script
- LMLK seals from Lachish, ca 700 BCE.
- Scaraboid seal

== Sources ==
- Garbini. Landmarks of the World's Art, The Ancient World, by Giovanni Garbini, (McGraw-Hill Book Company, New York, Toronto), General Eds, Bernard S. Myers, New York, Trewin Copplestone, London, c 1966. Numerous examples of the Cylinder seal; ( 3 ) separate Discussions (only) of "Stamp sealing". No seals, or impressions thereof.
- Yule, Paul (1981). Early Cretan seals: a study of chronology (Marburger Studien zur Vor- und Frühgeschichte, Bd. 4). Mainz: NN. doi:10.11588/diglit.3044.
- Di Palma, Salvatore (2015). The History of Marks from Antiquity to the Middle Ages. Société des écrivains.
- Brown, Brian A.; Feldman, Marian H. (2013). Critical Approaches to Ancient Near Eastern Art. Walter de Gruyter. ISBN 9781614510352.
- Vikan, Gary (1991-01-01). "Stamps, Commercial". The Oxford Dictionary of Byzantium. Oxford University Press. doi:10.1093/acref/9780195046526.001.0001. ISBN 978-0-19-504652-6.
