= Mudbrick stamp =

Impression or stamp seals used in Mesopotamia

The mudbrick stamp or brick seal of Mesopotamia are impression or stamp seals made upon bricks or mudbrick. The inscribed seal is in mirror reverse on the 'mold', mostly with cuneiform inscriptions, and the foundation mudbricks are often part of the memorializing of temples, or other structures, as part of a "foundation deposit", a common honoring or invocation to a specific god or protector.

== Examples ==
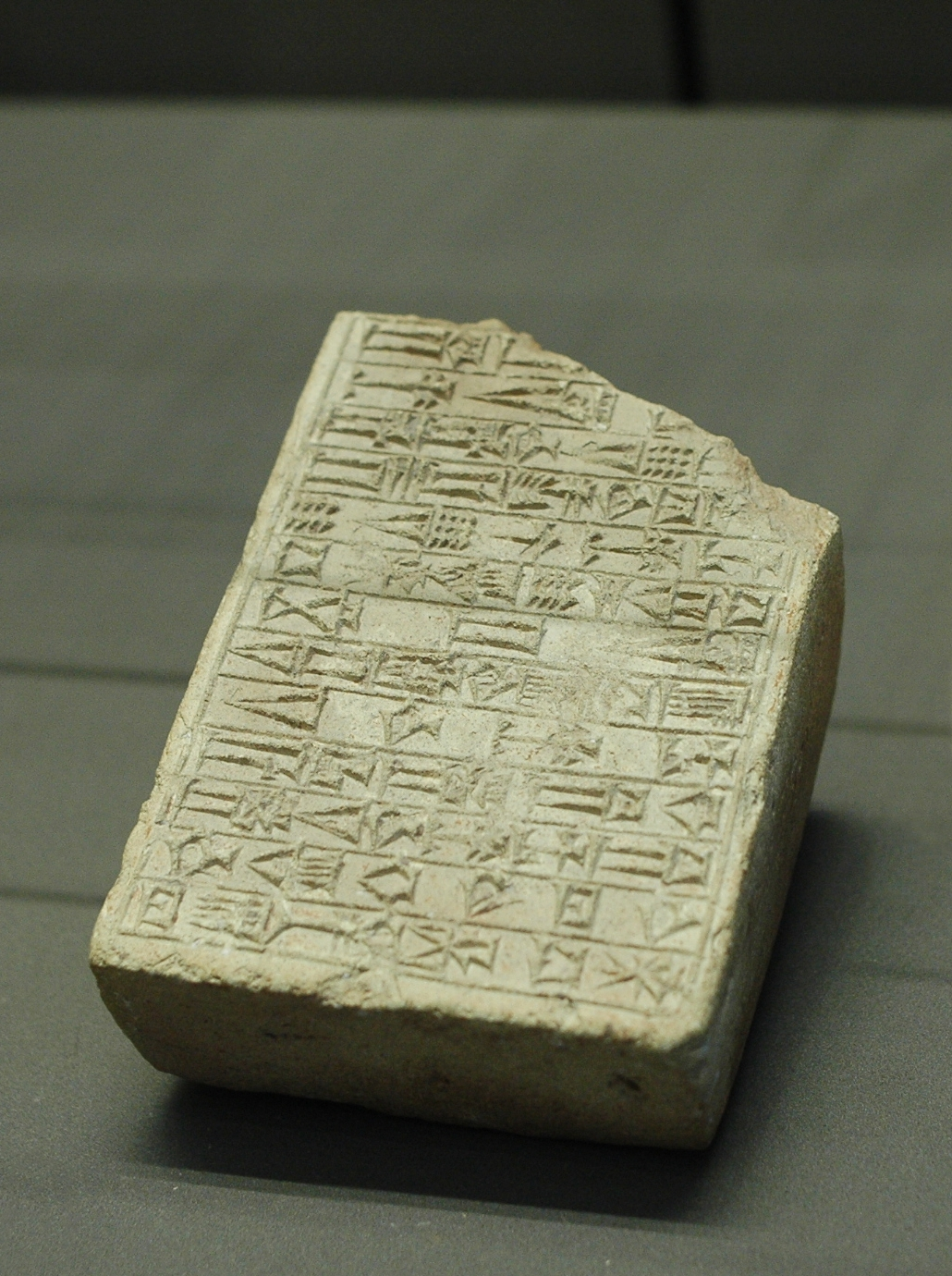
Brick "stamp mold" for the King of Larsa, Sin-Iddinam. (for Sun God, Utu, foundation deposit of temple)

The brick stamping mold for Sin-Iddinam of Larsa is housed in the Louvre. It is a nearly complete mold, with an inscription in cuneiform to the Sun God, Utu, as a foundation deposit for the god's temple, the Ebbabar.

The Adadnadinakhe bricks are notable examples in bilingual Greek and Aramaic inscriptions.

== Gallery ==
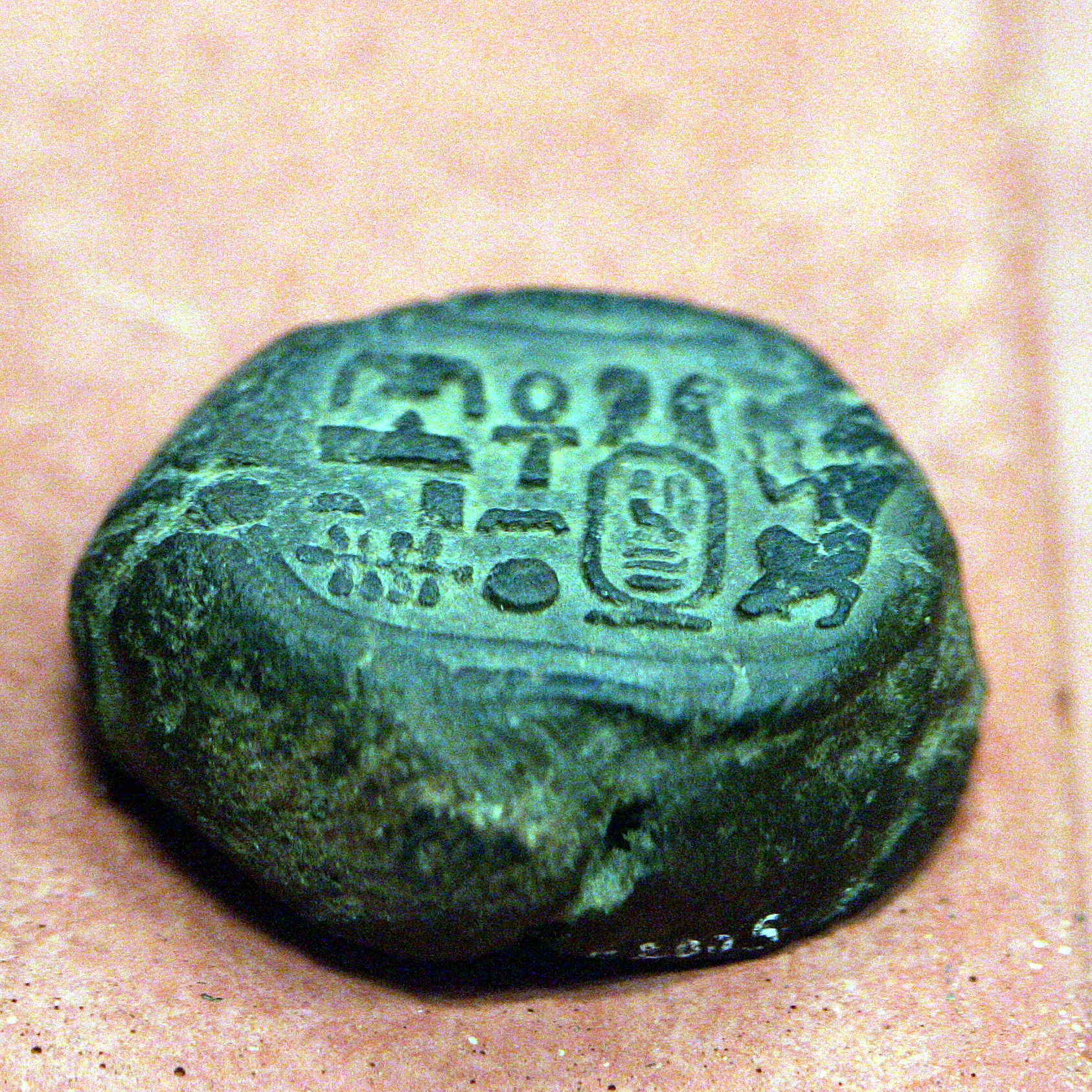
Ancient Egypt
later clay seal impression, Dynasty 26, with name of an undetermined king Psamtik

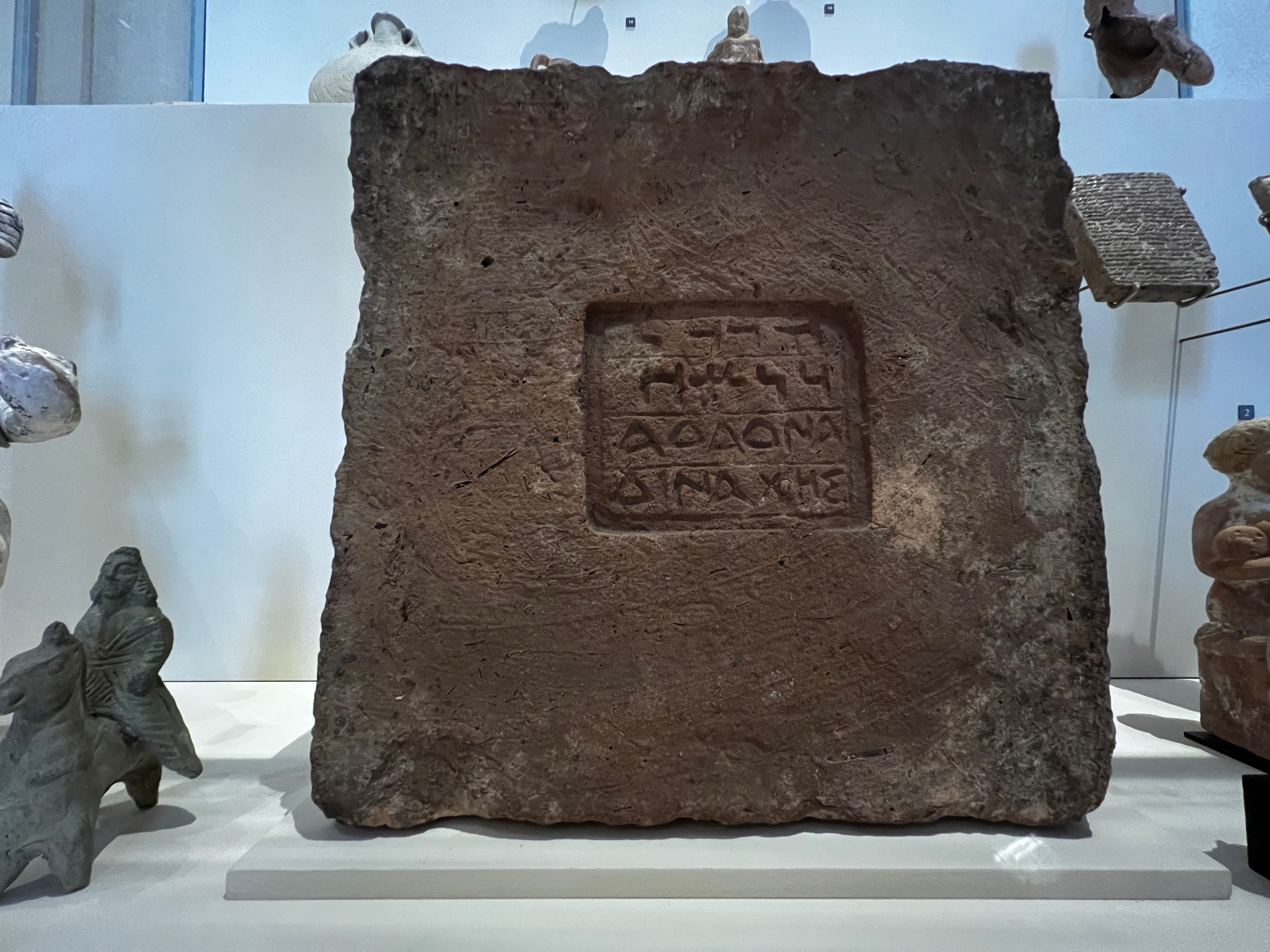
An Adadnadinakhe brick

=== Ancient Roman bricks ===
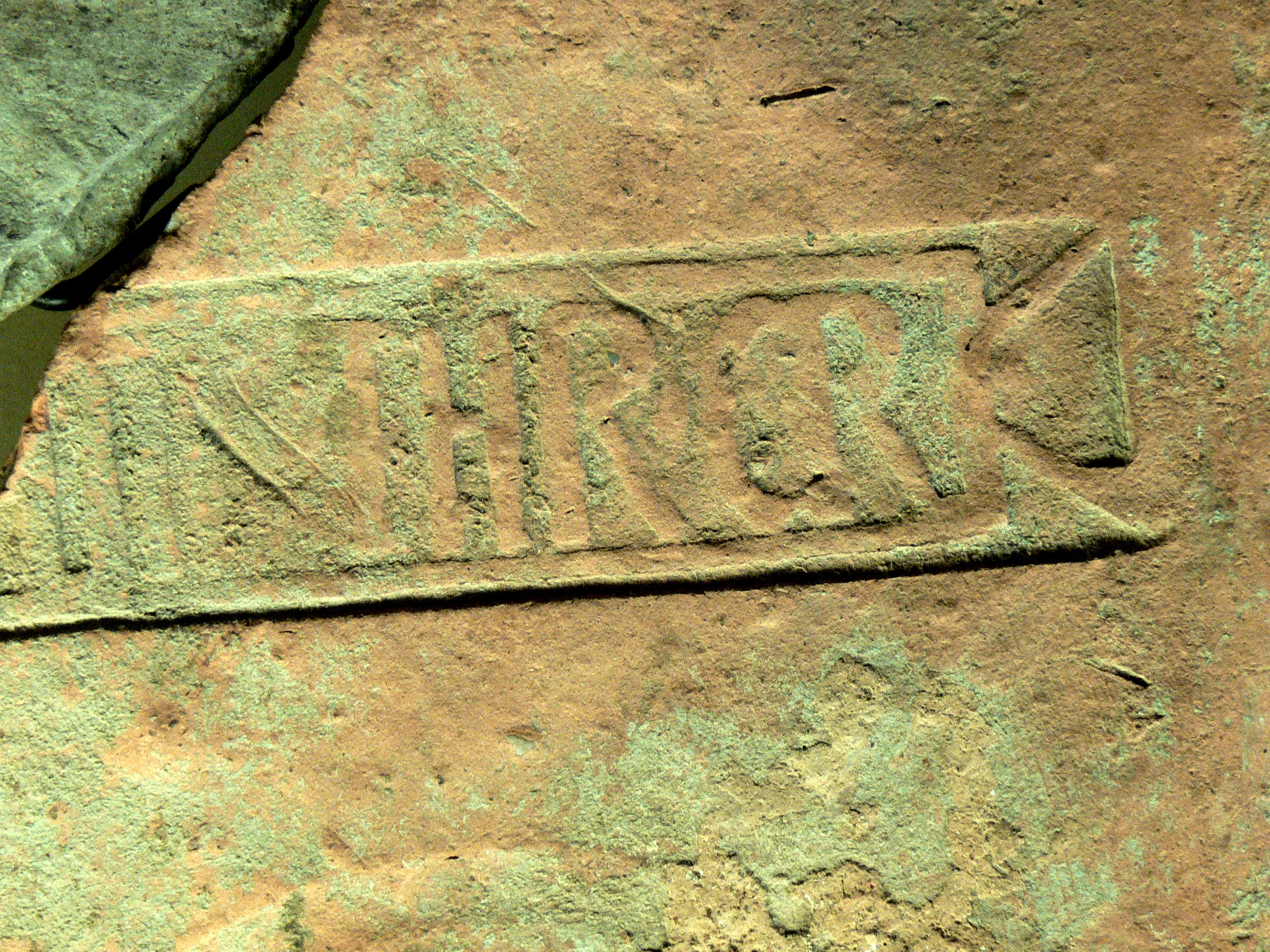
Ancient Roman brick, with inscription
