= Edith Porada =

American art historian

Edith Porada (22 August 1912, Vienna – 24 March 1994, Honolulu) was an Austrian-born art historian and archaeologist, a leading authority on ancient cylinder seals and a professor of art history and archaeology at Columbia University.

== About ==
Porada was born in Vienna to a wealthy family. She graduated from the Realreform Gymnasium Luithlen in 1930 and received her Ph.D. from the University of Vienna in 1935 with a dissertation about glyptic art of the Old Akkadian period. Later she moved to Paris to study at the Louvre. In 1938 she emigrated to the United States where she worked at the Metropolitan Museum of Art on the seals of Ashurnasirpal II.

She taught at Queens College and, beginning in 1958, at Columbia, attaining the rank of full professor in 1964. In 1969, she was elected a Fellow of the American Academy of Arts and Sciences. She was named Arthur Lehman Professor in 1974 and, upon retiring in 1984, held that title emeritus. In 1976 she was awarded the Gold Medal Award for Distinguished Archaeological Achievement from the Archaeological Institute of America. She was elected to the American Philosophical Society in 1978.

Columbia University established an Edith Porada professorship of ancient Near Eastern art history and archaeology with a $1 million endowment in 1983. In 1989 Porada was awarded Honorary Degree of Doctor of Letters for Columbia for "profound connections between the human experience and the interpretation of the cylinder seals."

== Publications ==
- Mesopotamian Art in Cylinder Seals (1947)
- Seal Impressions of Nuzi (1947)
- Corpus of Ancient Near Eastern Seals in North American Collections (1948)
- The Art of Ancient Iran (1965)
- Ancient Art in Seals (1980)
- Man and Images in the Ancient Near East (1995)
