= Cylinder seal =

Ancient seal for rolling impressions on surfaces

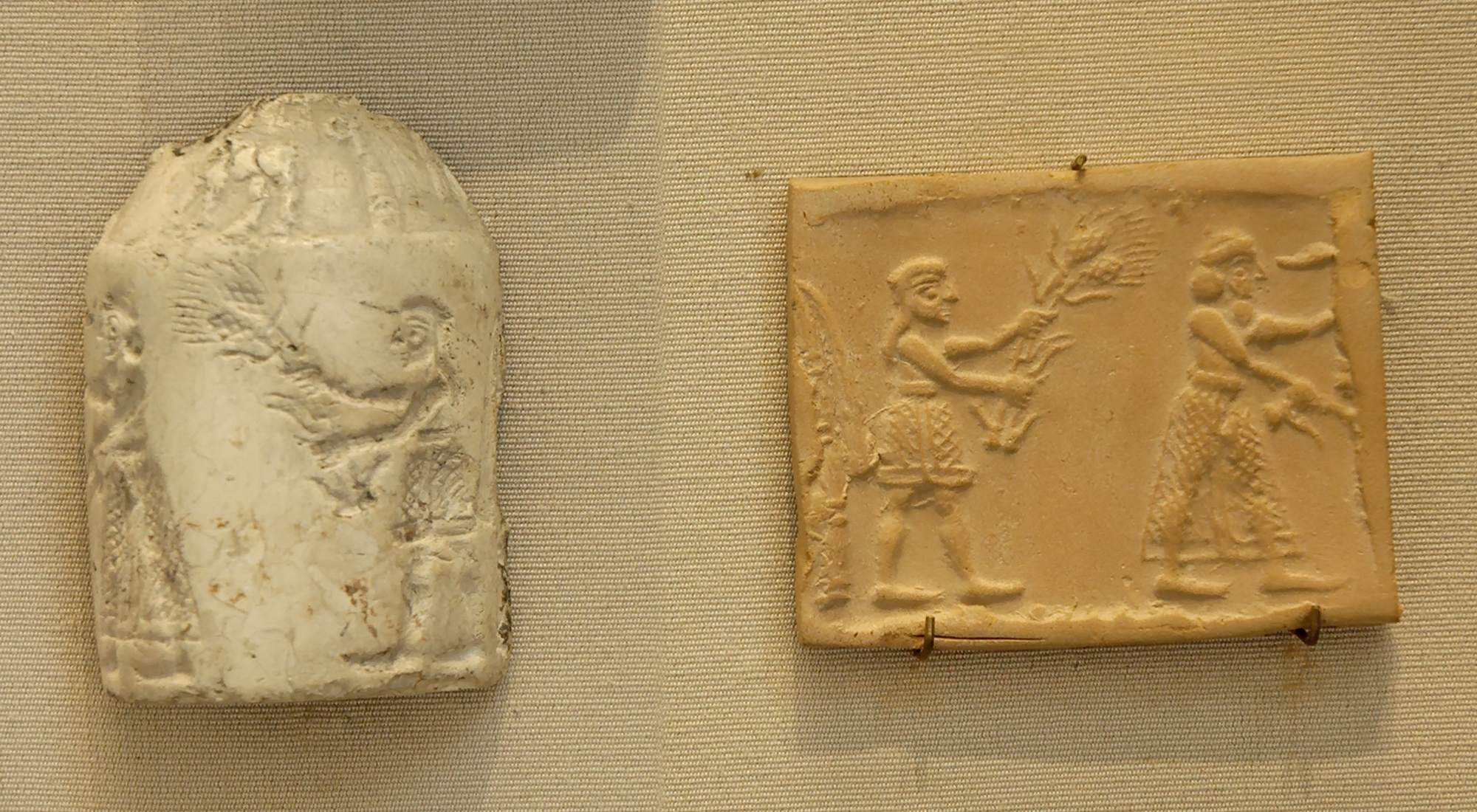
Cylinder-seal of the Uruk period and its impression, c. 3100 BC. Louvre Museum.

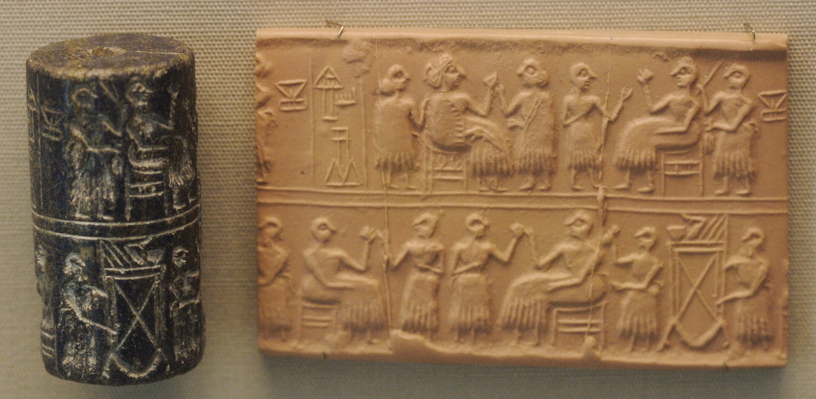
Cylinder seal of First Dynasty of Ur Queen Puabi, found in her tomb, dated c. 2600 BC, with modern impression. Inscription: 𒅤𒀜 𒎏 - Pu_{3}-abi_{(AD)} Nin - Queen Pu-abi.

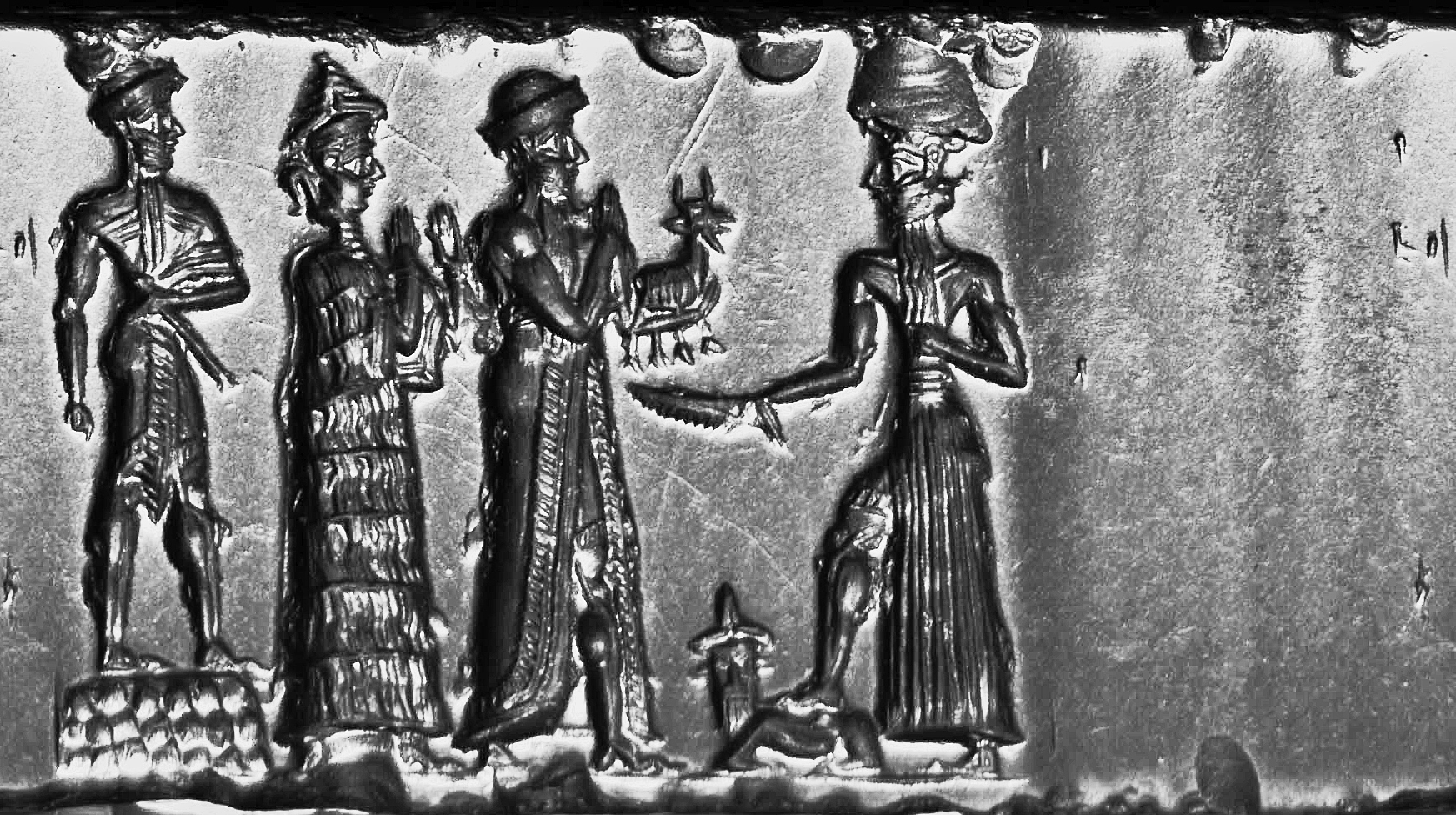
Old Babylonian cylinder seal, c. 1800 BC, hematite. Linescan camera image (reversed to resemble an impression).

A cylinder seal is a small round cylinder, typically about one inch (2 to 3 cm) in width, engraved with written characters or figurative scenes or both, used in ancient times to roll an impression onto a two-dimensional surface, generally wet clay. According to some sources, cylinder seals were invented around 3500 BC in the Near East, at the contemporary sites of Uruk in southern Mesopotamia and slightly later at Susa in south-western Iran during the Proto-Elamite period, and they follow the development of stamp seals in the Halaf culture or slightly earlier. They are linked to the invention of the latter's cuneiform writing on clay tablets.

Cylinder seals are a form of impression seal, a category which includes the stamp seal and finger ring seal. They survive in fairly large numbers and are important as art, especially in the Babylonian and earlier Assyrian periods. Impressions into a soft material can be taken without risk of damage to the seal, and they are often displayed in museums together with a modern impression on a small strip.

== Materials ==
The cylinder seals themselves are typically made from hardstones, and some are a form of engraved gem. They may also use glass or ceramics, like Egyptian faience. Many varieties of material such as hematite, obsidian, steatite, amethyst, lapis lazuli and carnelian were used to make cylinder seals. As the alluvial country of Mesopotamia lacks good stone for carving, the large stones of early cylinders were imported probably from Iran. Most seals have a hole running through the centre of the body, and they are thought to have typically been worn on a necklace to be always available when needed.

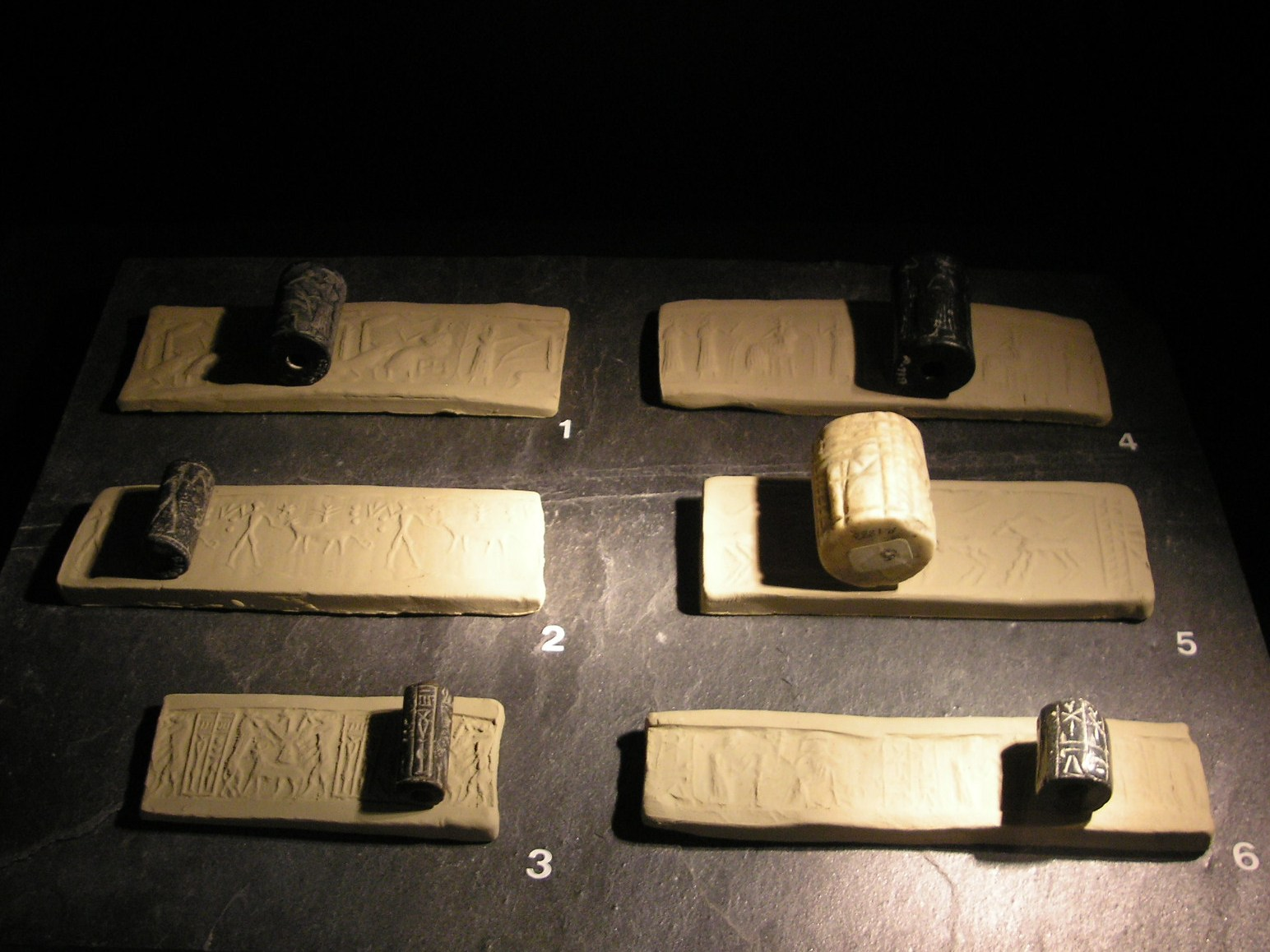
Size comparison of seals, with their impression strips (modern/current impressions)

== Uses ==
Cylinder-seal impressions served as an administrative tool, a form of signature, and for product branding. The cylinders themselves functioned as jewelry and as magical amulets; later versions would employ notations with Mesopotamian cuneiform. In later periods, they were used to notarize or attest to multiple impressions of clay documents. Graves and other sites housing precious items such as gold, silver, beads, and gemstones often included one or two cylinder seals, as honorific grave goods.

Most Mesopotamian cylinder seals form an image using depressions in the cylinder surface (see lead photo above) to make bumps on the impression and are used primarily on wet clay; but some cylinder seals (sometimes called roller stamps) print images using ink or similar using raised areas on the cylinder (such as the San Andrés cylinder seal, found not in Mesopotamia but in an Olmec archaeological site in the present-day Mexican state of Tabasco) and produce images on cloth and other similar two-dimensional surfaces.

Cylinder seal impressions appear on a variety of surfaces:

- amulets
- bales of commodities
- bricks
- clay tablets
- cloth
- components of fabricated objects
- doors
- envelopes
- storage jars

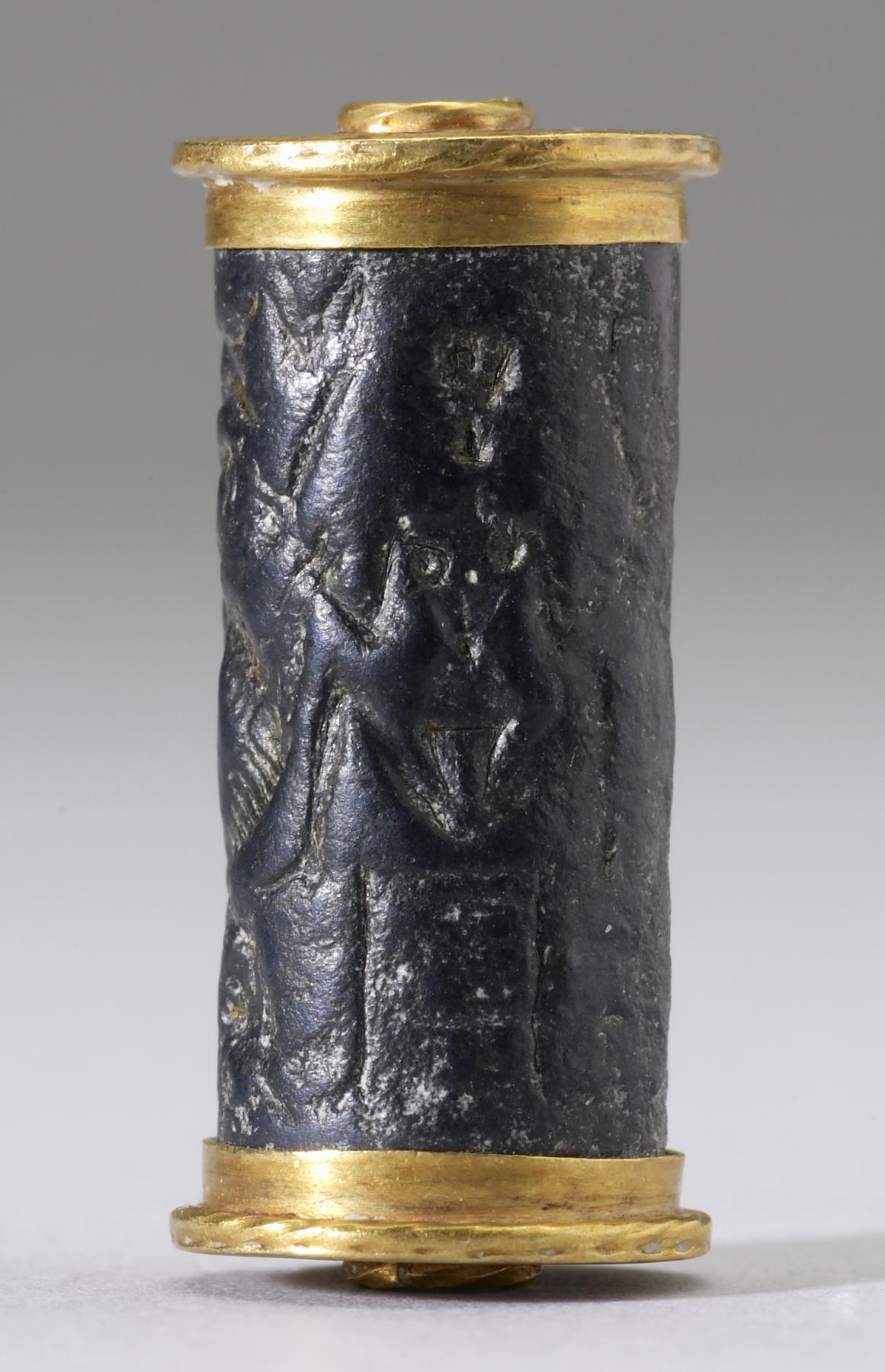
This cylinder seal from Cyprus shows two nude female figures. Each holds a flower, a symbol of fertility. The Walters Art Museum.

== Theme-driven, memorial, and commemorative nature ==
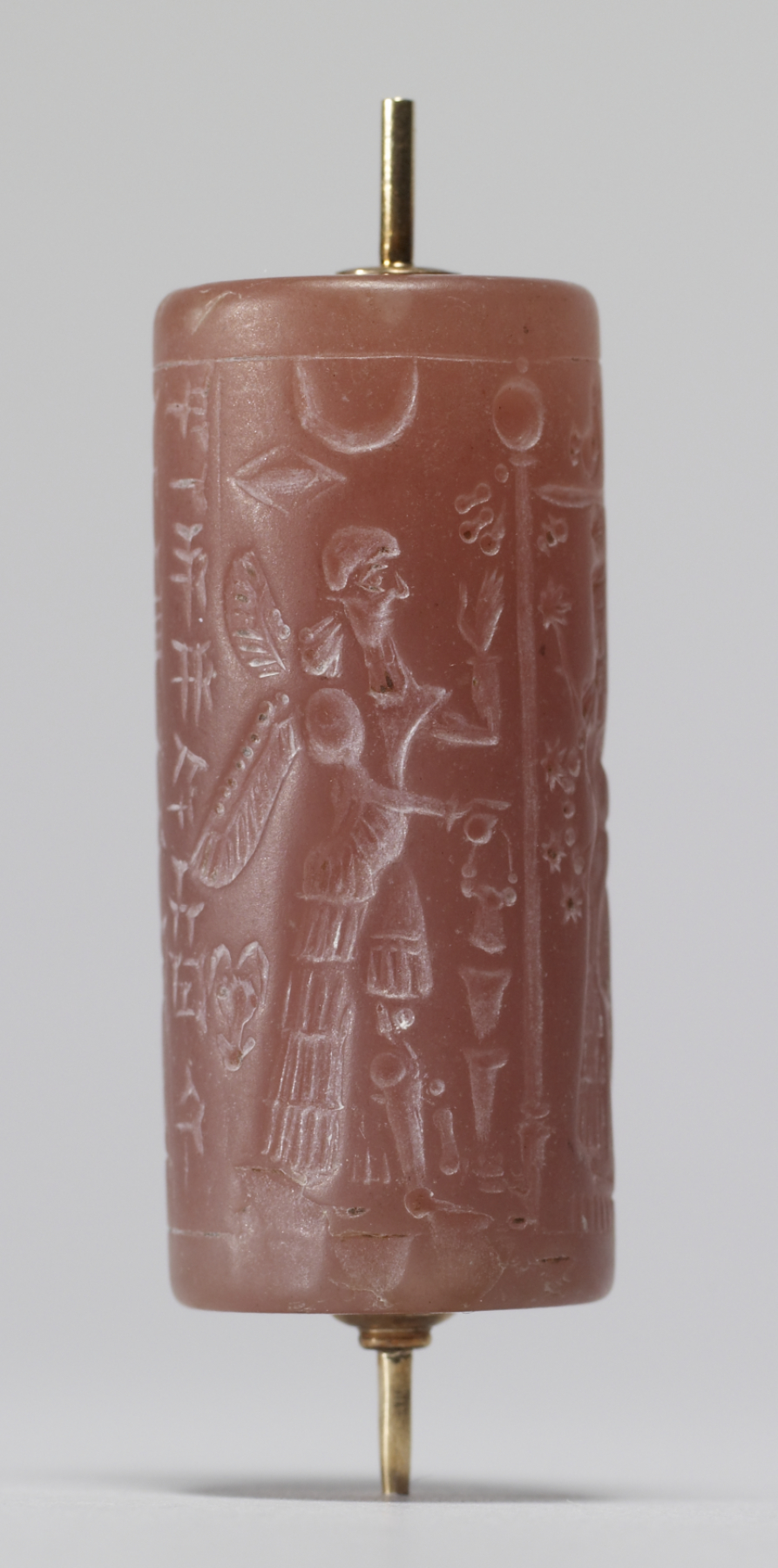
This Neo-Assyrian cylinder seal shows a ritual with winged protective deities. Walters Art Museum.

The images depicted on cylinder seals were mostly theme-driven and often sociological or religious. Instead of addressing the authority of the seal, a better study may be of the thematic nature of the seals, since they presented the ideas of the society in pictographic and text form. In a famous cylinder depicting Darius I of Persia, he is aiming his drawn bow at an upright enraged lion impaled by two arrows, while his chariot horse is trampling a dead lion. The scene is framed between two slim palm trees and a block of cuneiform text and, above the scene, the Faravahar symbol of Ahura Mazda, the god representation of Zoroastrianism.

== Categories of seals ==
The reference below, Garbini, covers many of the following categories of cylinder seal. Dominique Collon's book First Impressions, which is dedicated to the topic, has over 1000 illustrations.

A categorization of cylinder seals:

- Akkadian cylinder seals.
  - Akkadian seal, c. 2300 BC, stone seal w/ modern impression. See National Geographic Ref. The glyptic (the Scenes) shows "God in barge", people, and offerings.
- Assyrian cylinder seals.
- Cypriote Cylinder Seals.
- Egyptian cylinder seals.
  - Predynastic Egyptian Naqada era tombs and graves (imported).
  - Egyptian Faience; see Pepi I ext link.
- Hittite cylinder seals.
  - Clay envelope usage, etc.; see Kultepe.
- Kassite (the Kassites), cylinder seals.
- Mittanian cylinder seals.
- Old Babylonian cylinder seals.
- Persian cylinder seals; see Darius I, Robinson ref.
- Proto-Elamite cylinder seals.
- Sumerian cylinder seals.
  - Seals of the "Moon-God"; see Sin.
  - see Ref. (Robinson), Seal of Ur-Nammu, 2112–2095 BC. Close-up picture of Seal, and adjacent 'modern impression', high resolution, 2X-3X natural size :: see https://www.britishmuseum.org/collection/object/W_1880-1009-1
  - "Shamash pictographic seals"; see Mari, Syria.
- Neo-Sumerian cylinder seals.
  - see Ref (Garbini), "Seated God, and Worshippers", Cylinder seal, and a modern Impressin, p. 40, (British Museum, London).
- Syrian cylinder seals.

== See also ==
A roll-out of the San Andres ceramic cylinder seal containing what has been proposed as evidence of the earliest writing system in Mesoamerica. This cylinder seal is dated to c. 650 BC and is unrelated to the Mesopotamian cylinder seals.

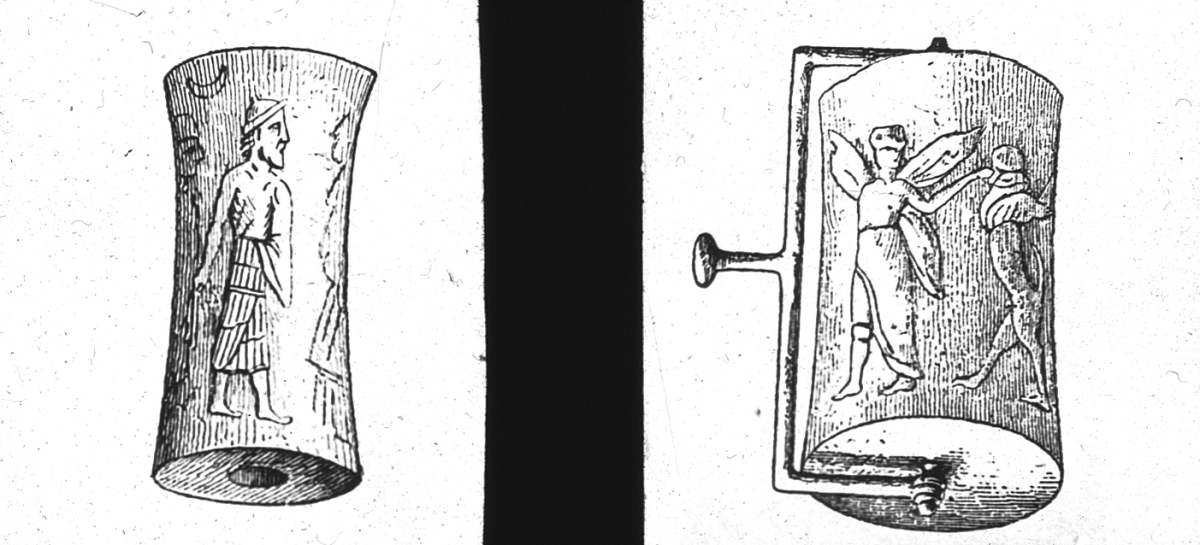
Assyria. Seals showing method of mounting; Brooklyn Museum Brooklyn Museum Archives, Goodyear Archival Collection

- Ancient Near Eastern seals and sealing practices
- Seal (device)
- Impression seal
- Stamp seal
- LMLK seal
- Mudbrick stamp
- Scaraboid seal
