= James C. Wang =

Taiwanese-American biochemist and biologist

- Born: November 18, 1936 (age 89); Jiangsu, China
- Citizenship: USA (Chinese by birth)
- Education: National Taiwan University (BS); South Dakota State University (MS); University of Missouri (PhD)
- Known for: Discovery of topisomerases
- Scientific career
- Fields: Biochemistry
- Institutions: California Institute of Technology; University of California, Berkeley; Harvard University

James C. Wang (Chinese: 王倬; pinyin: Wáng Zhuō; born November 18, 1936) is a Taiwanese-American biochemist and molecular biologist known for his discovery of the topoisomerases class of enzymes. He is a professor of biochemistry and molecular biology at Harvard University.

== Education and career ==
After his graduating with his bachelor's degree at National Taiwan University and earning his Ph.D. from the University of Missouri, he became a research fellow at the California Institute of Technology. He then taught at the University of California at Berkeley from 1966 until 1977, when he joined the faculty at Harvard University. He was named the Mallinckrodt Professor of Biochemistry and Molecular Biology at Harvard in 1988. He retired in 2006.

He was elected as an academician of the Taiwan Academia Sinica in 1982 and a member of the United States National Academy of Sciences.

Wang discovered DNA topoisomerases (or local enzymes) and proposed a mechanism for their operation in the 1970s. He also studied the configuration (or topology) of DNA, an approach that proved fruitful in helping to explain how the structure of the double helix coils and relaxes.
