= Marian Feldman =

American art historian

Academic background
- Education: Harvard University
- Thesis: Luxury goods from Ras Shamra-Ugarit and their role in the international relations of the eastern Mediterranean and Near East during the late bronze age (1998)

Marian Feldman, American art historian, holds the W.H. Collins Vickers Chair in Archeology at Johns Hopkins University, where her scholarship focuses on Ancient Near Eastern art, especially the areas of international exchange of material culture and ideas and collective memory. In the past she taught at the University of California, Berkeley, and shorter appointments at University of Heidelberg, Bogazici University, and Stanford University's Center for the Advanced Study of the Behavioral Sciences. Her education was at Harvard University, with Irene Winter, and Columbia University with Edith Porada.

Feldman was the co-principal Investigator of the international research collaboration, Material Entanglements in the Ancient Mediterranean And Beyond, with the National Hellenic Institute in Greece.

== Selected publications ==
- Cheng, Jack; Feldman, Marian, eds. (2007-06-22). Ancient Near Eastern Art in Context. BRILL. doi:10.1163/ej.9789004157026.i-522. ISBN 978-90-04-15702-6.
- Feldman, Marian H. (2006-05-15). Diplomacy by Design. Chicago London: University of Chicago Press. ISBN 978-0-226-24044-2.
- Heinz, Marlies; Feldman, Marian H. (2007). Representations of Political Power. Winona Lake, Ind: Eisenbrauns. ISBN 978-1-57506-135-1. OCLC 123029792.
- Feldman, Marian H. (2014-10-30). Communities of Style. Chicago; London: University of Chicago Press. ISBN 978-0-226-10561-1.
