= Susa =

Ancient city in Iran

- شوش (Persian)
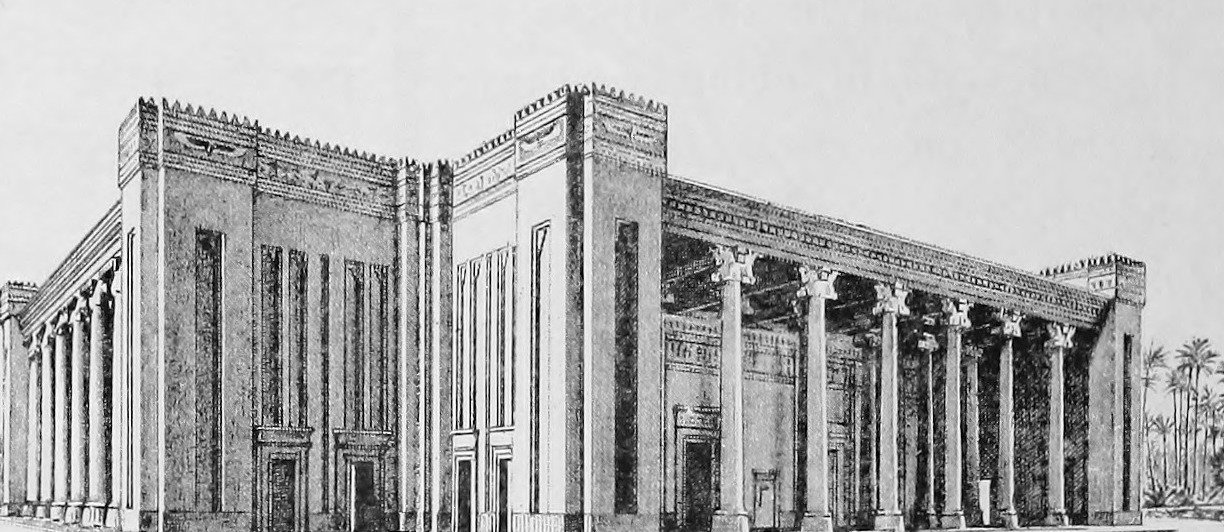
- The Palace of Darius in Susa

- Location within Iran Location within West and Central Asia
- 32°11′26″N 48°15′28″E
- Type: Settlement
- Location: Shush, Khuzestan Province, Iran
- Region: Zagros Mountains

History
- Built: 4395-4200 BCE; the late 5th millennium BCE
- Abandoned: 1218 AD
- Event: Battle of Susa

UNESCO World Heritage Site
- Official name: Susa
- Criteria: Cultural: i, ii, iii, iv
- Reference: 1455
- Inscription: 2015 (39th Session)

Iran National Heritage List
- Official name: Susa
- Type: Archaeological Site
- Designated: 1931
- Reference no.: 51
- Conservation organization: Cultural Heritage, Handicrafts and Tourism Organization of Iran

Susa (/ˈsuːsə/ SOO-sə) was an ancient city in the lower Zagros Mountains about 250 km (160 mi) east of the Tigris, between the Karkheh and Dez Rivers in Iran. It represents the current city of Shush, located on the site of ancient Susa. One of the most important cities of the Ancient Near East, Susa served as the capital of Elam and the winter capital of the Achaemenid Empire, and remained a strategic centre during the Parthian and Sasanian periods.

== Name ==
The name Susa is of Elamite origin and has appeared in many languages:

- Middle Elamite: 𒀸𒋗𒊺𒂗, romanized: Šušen
- Middle and Neo-Elamite: 𒋢𒋢𒌦, romanized: Šušun
- Neo-Elamite and Achaemenid Elamite: 𒀸𒋗𒐼𒀭, romanized: Šušan
- Achaemenid Elamite: 𒀸𒋗𒐼, romanized: Šuša
- Hebrew: שׁוּשָׁן Šūšān (Shushan)
- Ancient Greek: Σοῦσα Soûsa
- Old Persian: 𐏂𐎢𐏁𐎠 Çūšā
- Middle Persian: 𐭮𐭥𐭱𐭩 Sūš or 𐭱𐭥𐭮 Šūs
- New Persian: شوش Šuš [ʃuʃ]
- Syriac: ܫܘܫ Šuš

== Literary references ==
Map showing the area of the Elamite kingdom (in orange) and the neighboring areas. The approximate Bronze Age extension of the Persian Gulf is shown.

Susa was one of the most important cities of the Ancient Near East. In historic literature, Susa appears in the very earliest Sumerian records: for example, it is described as one of the places obedient to Inanna, patron deity of Uruk, in Enmerkar and the Lord of Aratta.

=== Hebrew Bible ===
Susa is mentioned by the name Shushan in the Hebrew Bible’s Ketuvim (Writings) section, chiefly in the Book of Esther (where the narrative events are set in Susa), and once each in the books of Ezra (4:9), Nehemiah (1:1), and Daniel (8:2). According to these Jewish biblical texts, Nehemiah lived in Susa during the Jews’ Babylonian captivity in the 5th century BC (as Daniel mentions in a prophetic vision), and Esther became queen in Susa when she married King Ahasuerus and subsequently saved the Jewish people of the Persian Empire from genocide.

A tomb presumed to be Daniel’s is located in the area of Susa, known as Shush-Daniel. While a large portion of the tomb’s current structure was dated to 1871, the identification of Susa as Daniel’s burial place has been cited by Jews such as Benjamin of Tudela at least as early as 1167 AD.

=== Ancient Greek Theatre ===
Susa is the setting for the Aeschylus play, The Persians. The play concerns the repercussions for Xerxes, and Persia, after his failed attempt to conquer Greece at the Battle of Salamis.

=== Pseudepigrapha ===
Susa is further mentioned in the Book of Jubilees (8:21 & 9:2) as one of the places within the inheritance of Shem and his eldest son Elam; and in 8:1, "Susan" is also named as the son (or daughter, in some translations) of Elam.

=== Islamic sources ===
Shushan is mentioned by Yaqubi as the first post-flood king, with a reign of 16 years.

== Excavation history ==
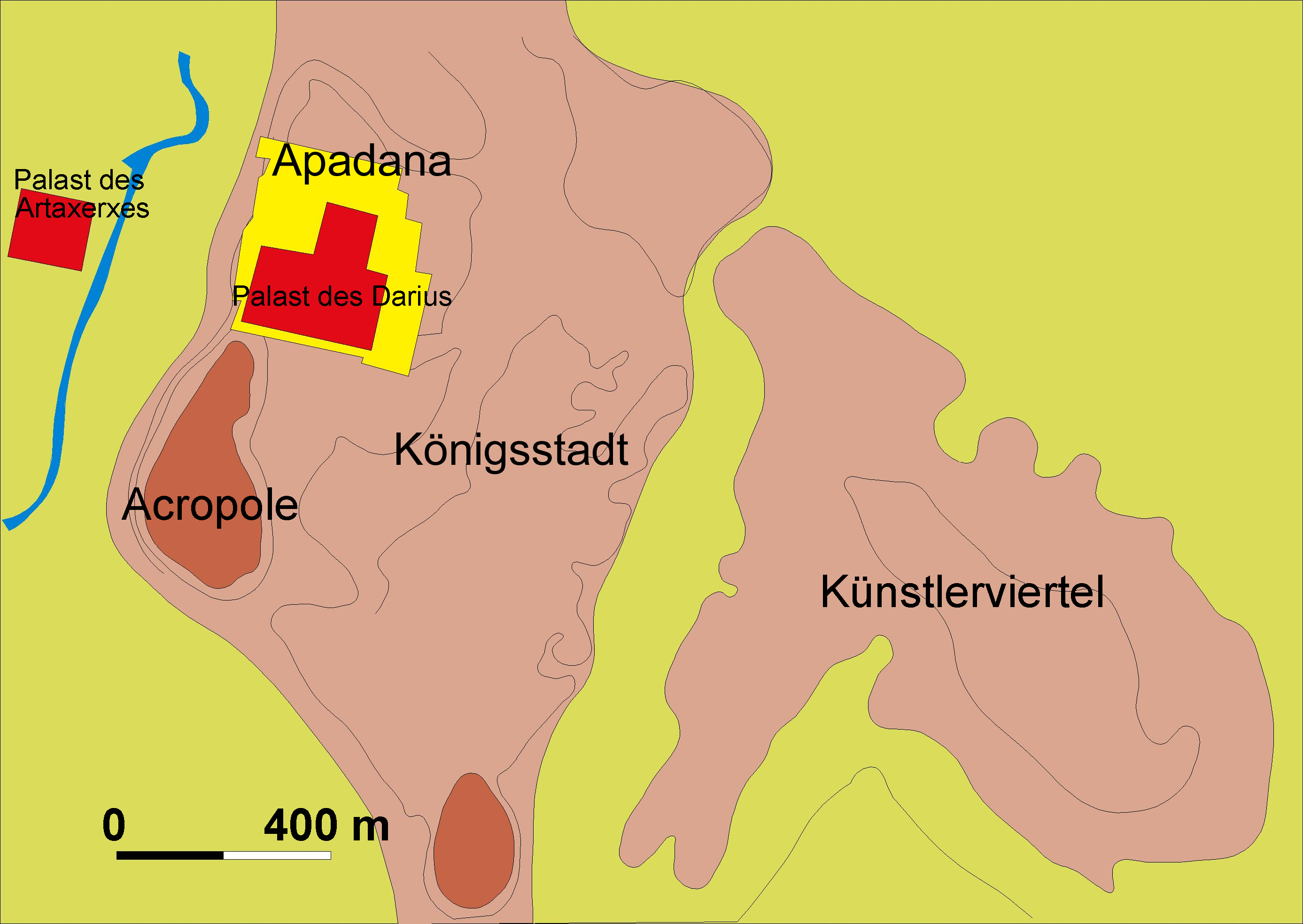
Site of Susa

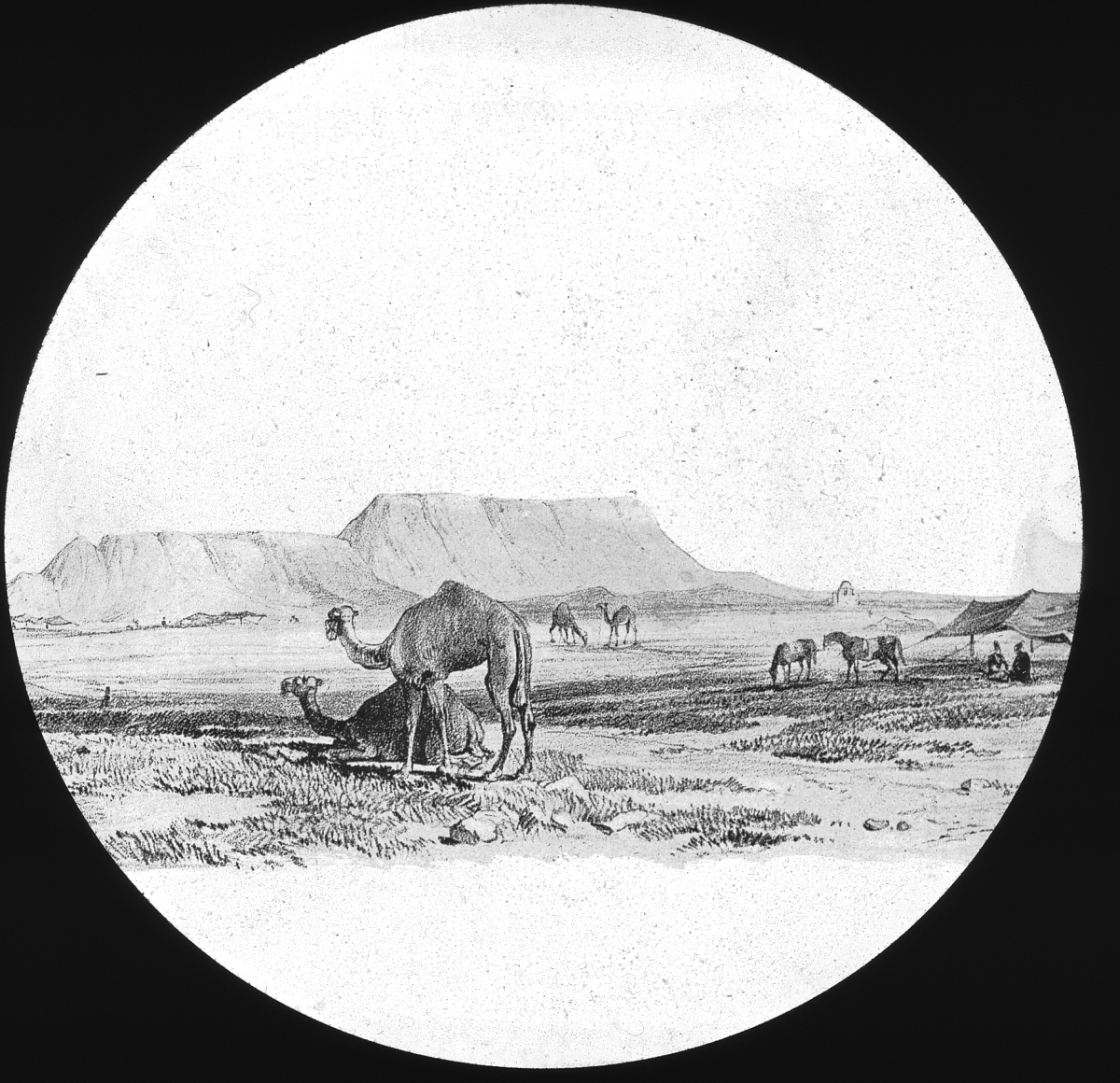
Assyria. Ruins of Susa, Brooklyn Museum Archives, Goodyear Archival Collection

The site was examined in 1836 by Henry Rawlinson and then by A. H. Layard.

In 1851, some modest excavation was done by William Loftus, accompanied by Fenwick Williams, who identified it as Susa. Among his finds was a jar containing around 110 coins, the earliest of which was dated to 697-98 AD.

In 1885 and 1886 Marcel-Auguste Dieulafoy and Jane Dieulafoy began the first French excavations, discovering glazed bricks, column bases, and capitals from the palace of the Achaemenid kings. However, they failed to identify mudbrick walls, which were then destroyed in the course of excavation. Almost all of the excavations at Susa, post-1885, were organized and authorized by the French government.

In two treaties in 1894 and 1899, the French gained a monopoly on all archaeological excavations in Iran indefinitely. Jacques de Morgan, after visiting the site in 1891, conducted major excavations from 1897 until 1911. De Morgan headed the newly formed French Délégation en Perse, which would continue to oversee French archeological activity in Iran under various names until the Iranian Revolution of 1979, focusing mainly on the plain of Susiana. The excavations that were conducted in Susa brought many artistic and historical artifacts back to France. These artifacts filled multiple halls in the Museum of the Louvre throughout the late 1890s and early 1900s. De Morgan's most important work was the excavation of the Grande Tranchée in the Acropole mound, where he found the stele of Naram-Sin, a collection of Babylonian kudurrus (boundary stones), the stele bearing the Code of Hammurabi, an ornamented bronze table of snakes, the bronze statue of Queen Napir-Asu, and thousands of inscribed bricks. His finds showed Susa to be the most important center of Elamite civilization, which was effectively discovered by the French mission at Susa. Unfortunately, de Morgan, trained originally as a mining engineer, was primarily concerned with the neolithic levels of the site and destroyed many of the later historical layers through a combination of negligence and intentional demolition. While his methods were well suited for pre-historic sites, it irrevocably damaged the archeological landscape of Susa, destroying much of the architectural remains of the site and by extension the provenance of many of the remarkable objects uncovered. De Morgan also oversaw the construction of Shush Castle, a European medieval style castle on the northernmost edge of the Acropole, which was made largely out of spoliated bricks taken from the ancient site itself. While the castle was ostensibly built to protect the excavators from attacks by nearby bandits, the castle was administered directly by the Délégation en Perse and its successor agencies, and was considered the property of the French government outside the jurisdiction of the then Qajar government of Iran. Despite the richness of the archeological material found during de Morgan's excavations, especially from the Elamite period, he gradually lost interest in the site when it did not yield the breadth of neolithic material he had hoped for. He did not return to Susa after 1907, and resigned his post as director of the Délégation en Perse in 1912 after being accused of mismanaging the agency's funds.

Following de Morgan's departure in 1907, excavation efforts continued under his successor Roland de Mecquenem until the outbreak of World War I in 1914. De Mecquenem, like de Morgan, was trained primarily as a mining engineer, and had worked at Susa since de Morgan brought him to the site in 1903. De Mecquenem followed a similarly destructive methodology to his predecessor, described by the classical archeologist Laurianne Martinez-Sève, a specialist in Hellenistic Susa, as "bulk clearings more like removing earthworms than conducting true scientific excavations." After the resignation of Jacques de Morgan in 1912, the Délégation en Perse was reconstituted as the French Mission Archéologique de Perse, with no single director. De Mecquenem conducted all further excavation under the local mandate of the French Mission Archéologique de Susiane, which he co-directed alongside the Assyriologist Father Vincent Scheil, who focused on the texts found at the site and oversaw the local Mission's publications. French work at Susa resumed after the end of World War I, still led by De Mecquenem, and continued excavations until the ramp up of tensions preceding the start of World War II in 1939. Earlier, in 1927, two years after the overthrow of the Qajar dynasty in favor of the new Pahlavi dynasty, the French monopoly on archeological excavation in Iran was rescinded. While this was a major sea-change in the landscape of Iranian archeology overall, the excavations at Susa were minimally affected, with de Mecquenem continuing his excavations at Susa until 1938. In 1934, Louis le Breton joined the French expedition, working as de Mecquenem's assistant. It was under le Breton's direction that many of the smaller sites surrounding Susa, such as Jafarabad and Jowi were first excavated. To supplement the original publications of De Mecquenem the archives of his excavation have now been put online thanks to a grant from the Shelby White Levy Program.

Roman Ghirshman took over direction of the French efforts in 1946, after the end of the war. Together with his wife Tania Ghirshman, he continued there until 1967. The Ghirshmans concentrated on excavating a single part of the site, the hectare sized Ville Royale, taking it all the way down to bare earth. The pottery found at the various levels enabled a stratigraphy to be developed for Susa.

From 1969 until 1979 excavations were conducted under Jean Perrot.

In 2019 the Susa salvage project was launched to counter the construction of a transportation underpass in the vicinity of the site.

== History ==
=== Early settlement ===
In urban history, Susa is one of the oldest-known settlements of the region. Based on calibrated carbon-14 dating, the foundation of a settlement there occurred as early as 4200 BC. In the region around Susa were a number of towns (with their own platforms) and villages that maintained a trading relationship with the city, especially those along the Zagro frontier.

The founding of Susa corresponded with the abandonment of nearby villages. Potts suggests that the settlement may have been founded to try to reestablish the previously destroyed settlement at Chogha Mish, about 25 km to the west. Previously, Chogha Mish was a very large settlement, and it featured a similar massive platform that was later built at Susa.

Another important settlement in the area is Chogha Bonut, which was discovered in 1976.

=== Susa I period (4200–3800 BC) ===
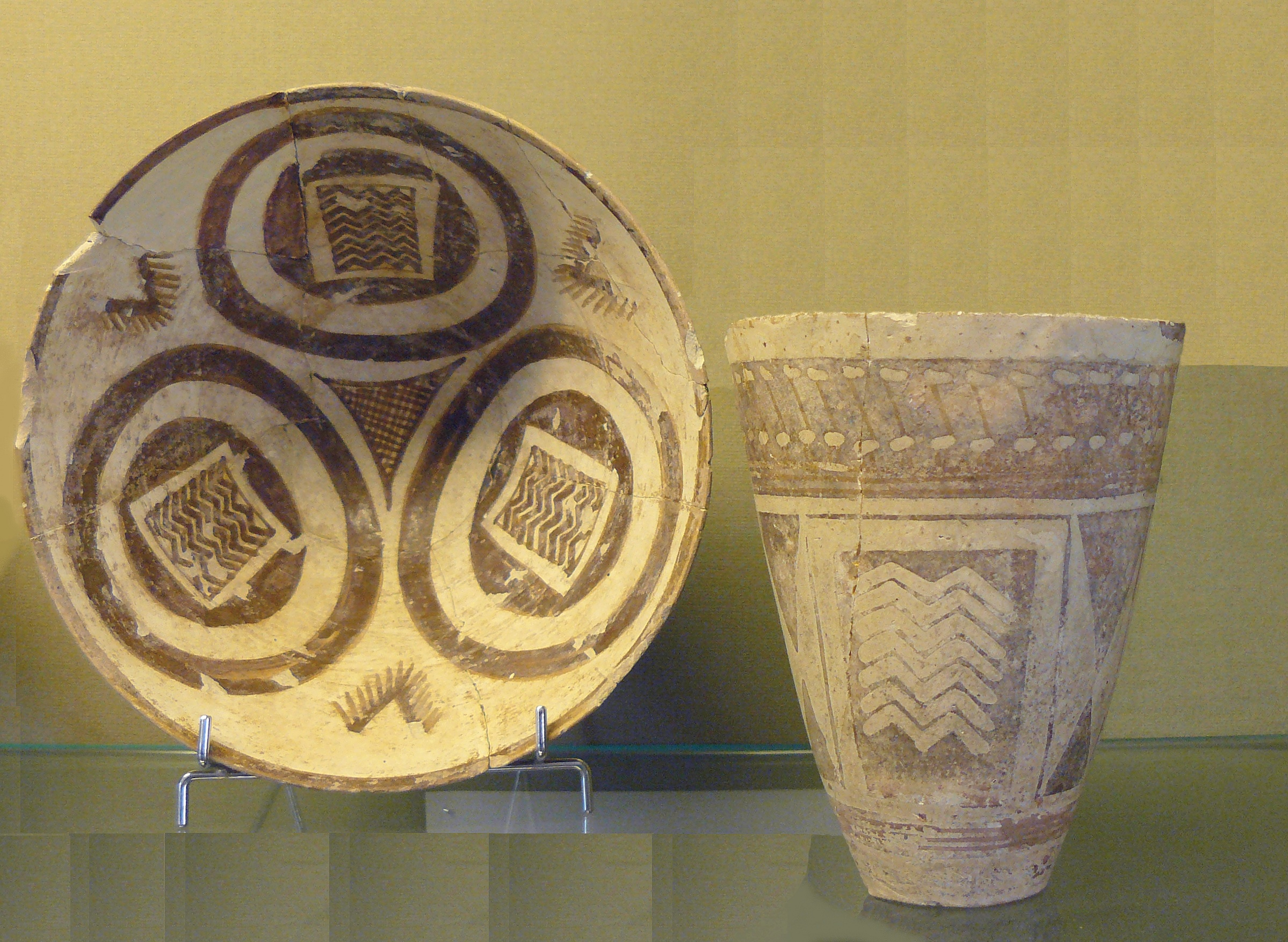
Goblet and cup, Iran, Susa I style, 4th millennium BC – Ubaid period; goblet height c. 12 cm; Sèvres – Cité de la céramique, France

Shortly after Susa was first settled over 6000 years ago, its inhabitants erected a monumental platform that rose over the flat surrounding landscape. The exceptional nature of the site is still recognizable today in the artistry of the ceramic vessels that were placed as offerings in a thousand or more graves near the base of the temple platform.

Susa's earliest settlement is known as the Susa I period (c. 4200–3900 BC). Two settlements named by archaeologists the Acropolis (7 ha) and the Apadana (6.3 ha), would later merge to form Susa proper (18 ha). The Apadana was enclosed by 6 metre thick walls of rammed earth (this particular place is named Apadana because it also contains a late Achaemenid structure of this type).

Nearly two thousand pots of Susa I style were recovered from the cemetery, most of them now in the Louvre. The vessels found attest to the artistic and technical achievements of their makers, and they hold clues about the organization of the society that commissioned them. Painted ceramic vessels from Susa in the earliest first style are a late, regional version of the Mesopotamian Ubaid ceramic tradition that spread across the Near East during the fifth millennium BC. Susa I style was very much a product of the past and of influences from contemporary ceramic industries in the mountains of western Iran. The recurrence in close association of vessels of three types—a drinking goblet or beaker, a serving dish, and a small jar—implies the consumption of three types of food, apparently thought to be as necessary for life in the afterworld as it is in this one. Ceramics of these shapes, which were painted, constitute a large proportion of the vessels from the cemetery. Others are coarse cooking-type jars and bowls with simple bands painted on them and were probably the grave goods of the sites of humbler citizens as well as adolescents and, perhaps, children. The pottery is carefully made by hand. Although a slow wheel may have been employed, the asymmetry of the vessels and the irregularity of the drawing of encircling lines and bands indicate that most of the work was done freehand.

==== Metallurgy ====
Copper metallurgy is also attested during this period, which was contemporary with metalwork at some highland Iranian sites such as Tepe Sialk.

As many as 40 copper axes have been found at the Susa cemetery, as well as 10 round discs probably used as mirrors. Many awls and spatulas were also found.

"Metal finds from the burials in Susa are the major metal assemblage from the end of the 5th millennium BCE. Strata 27 to 25 contained the earliest burials with a large number of axes, made from unalloyed copper and copper with elevated As [Arsenic] levels."

The cemetery of Chega Sofla, from the same timeframe, provides a lot of similar material, with many sophisticated metal objects. Chega Sofla is located in the same geographical area.

==== Ceramic objects ====
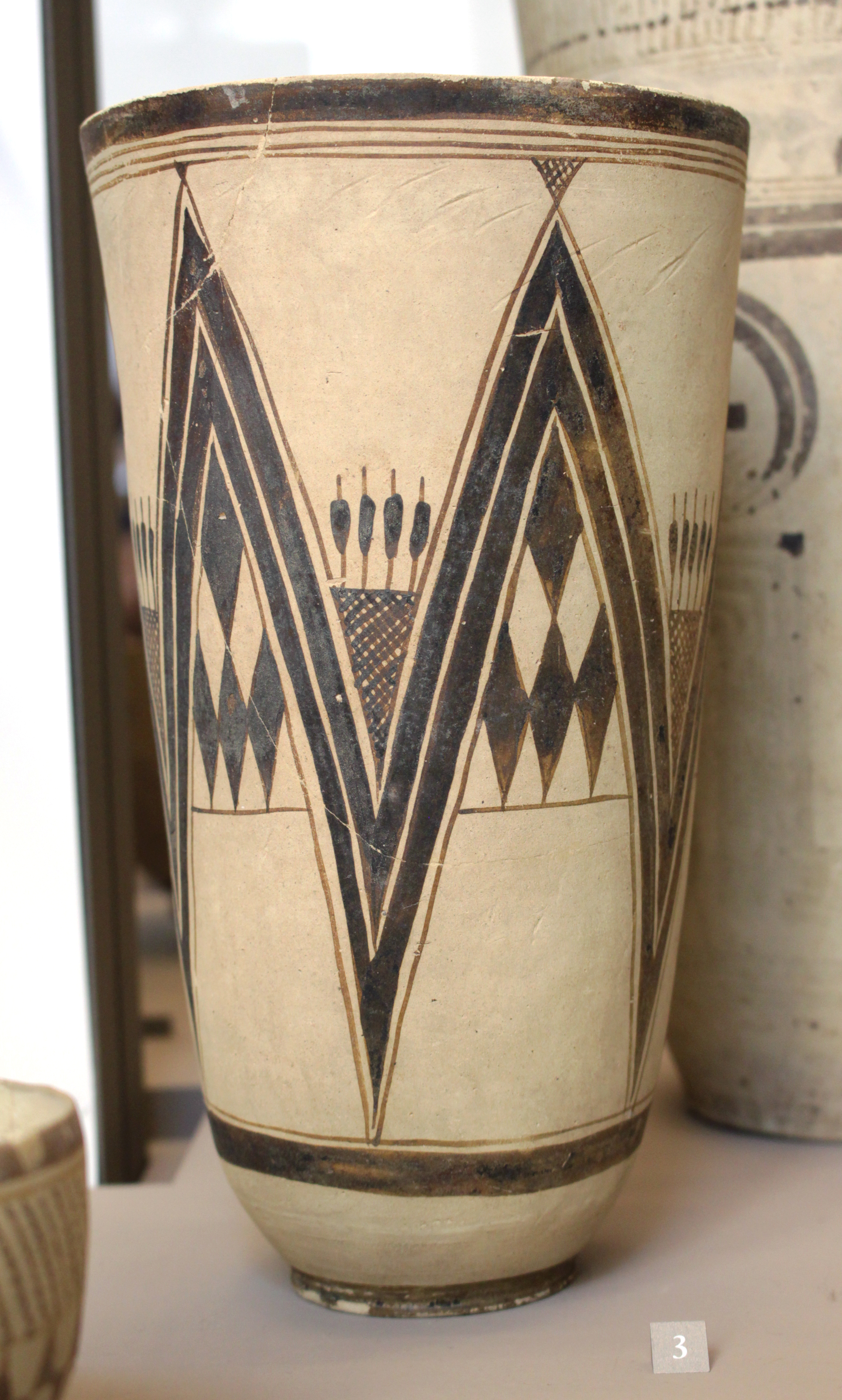

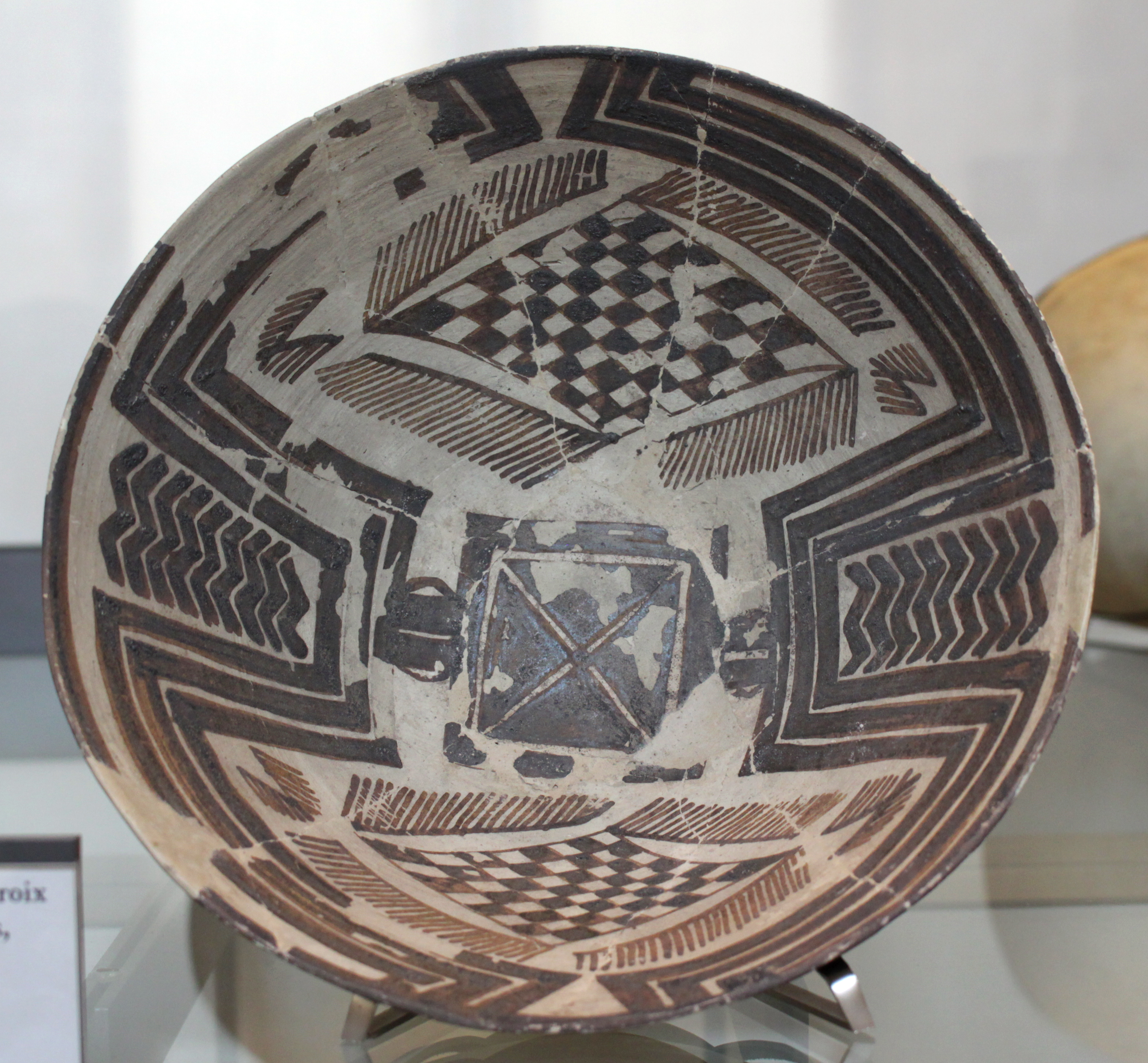

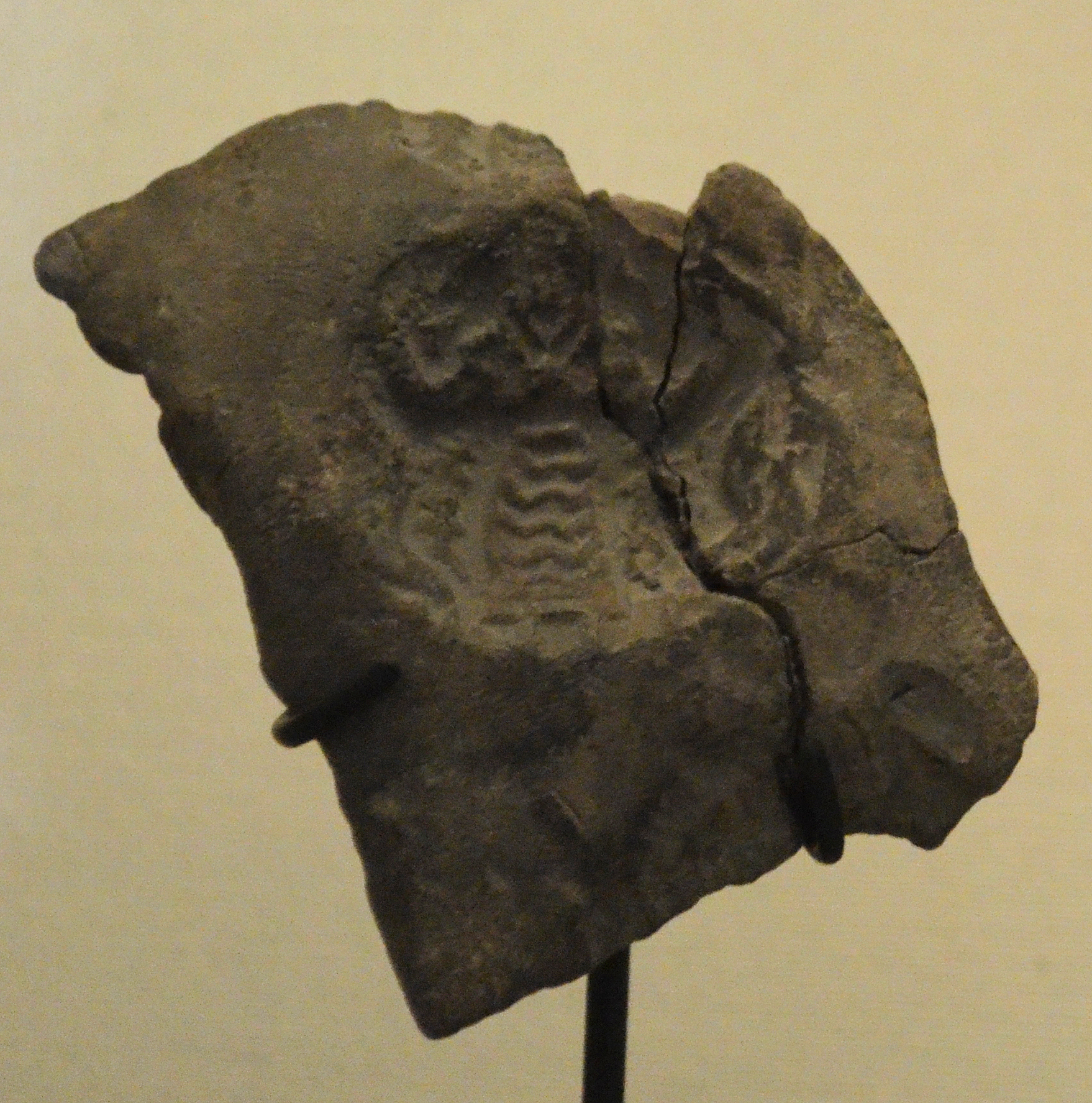
Master of animals, Susa I, Louvre Sb 2246.

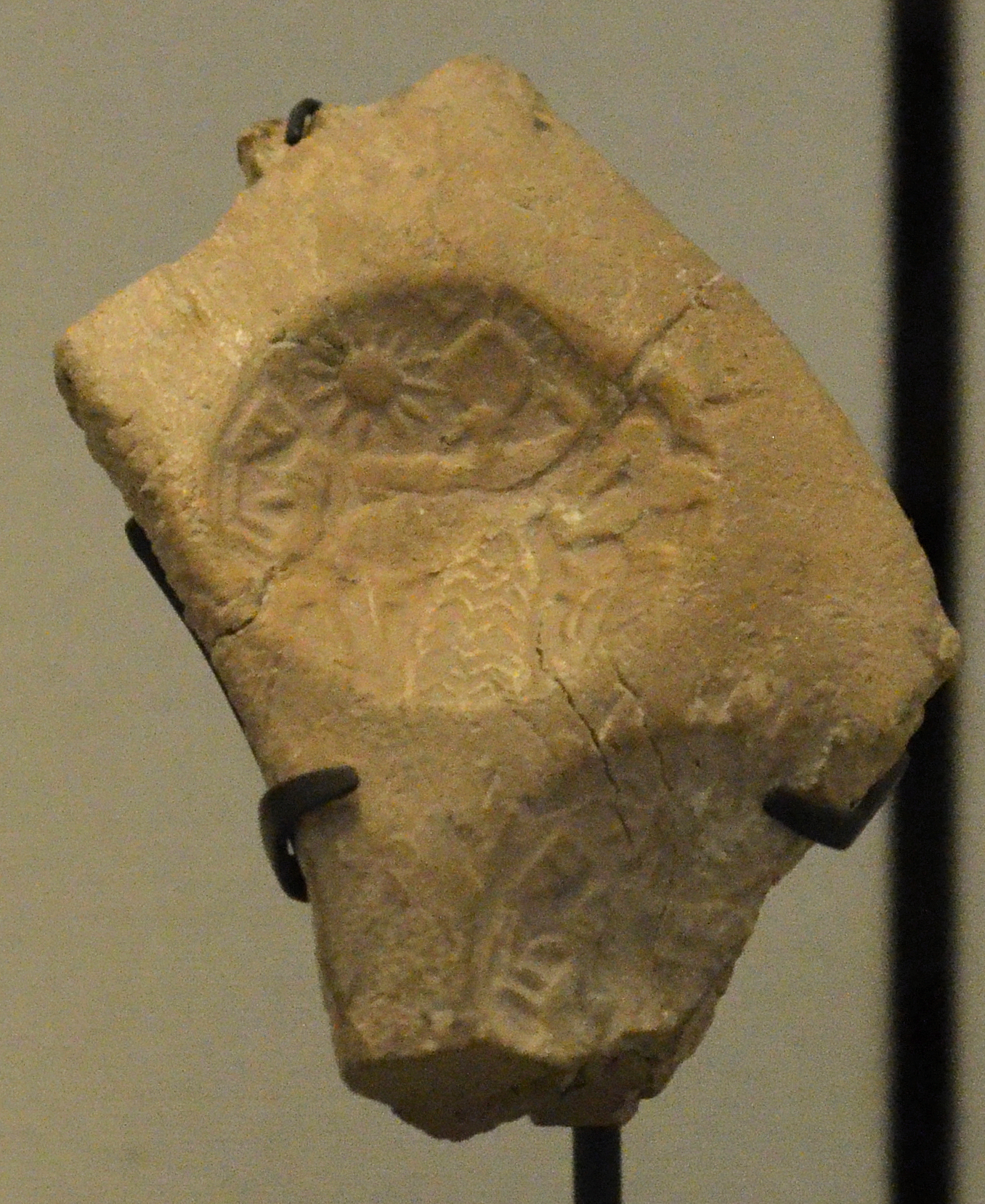
Sun and deities, Susa I, Louvre

=== Susa II and Uruk influence (3800–3100 BC) ===
Susa came within the Uruk cultural sphere during the Uruk period. An imitation of the entire state apparatus of Uruk, proto-writing, cylinder seals with Sumerian motifs, and monumental architecture is found at Susa. The comparative periodization of Susa and Uruk at this time remains disputed among scholars with some research indicating that Early Uruk period corresponds to Susa II period.

The nature and extent of Uruk influence in Susa is also disputed. Daniel T. Potts argues that the influence from the highland Iranian Khuzestan area in Susa was more significant at the early period, and also continued later on. Thus, Susa combined the influence of two cultures, from the highland area and from the alluvial plains. Potts also stresses that Susa did not simply borrow the writing and numerical systems of Uruk wholesale, but were adopted only partially and selectively as needed.

Uruk was far larger than Susa at the time, raising questions about its influence. Some scholars believe that Susa was part of the greater Uruk culture. Holly Pittman, an art historian at the University of Pennsylvania in Philadelphia says, "the Susanians are participating entirely in an Uruk way of life. They are not culturally distinct; the material culture of Susa is a regional variation of that on the Mesopotamian plain".

Others emphasize Susa's relative independence. They deny that Susa was a colony of Uruk: it maintained some independence for a long time, according to Potts. An architectural link has also been suggested between Susa, Tal-i Malyan, and Godin Tepe at this time, in support of the idea of the parallel development of the Proto-Cuneiform and proto-elamite scripts. Gilbert Stein, director of the University of Chicago's Oriental Institute, notes that "An expansion once thought to have lasted less than 200 years now apparently went on for 700 years. It is hard to think of any colonial system lasting that long. The spread of Uruk material is not evidence of Uruk domination; it could be local choice".

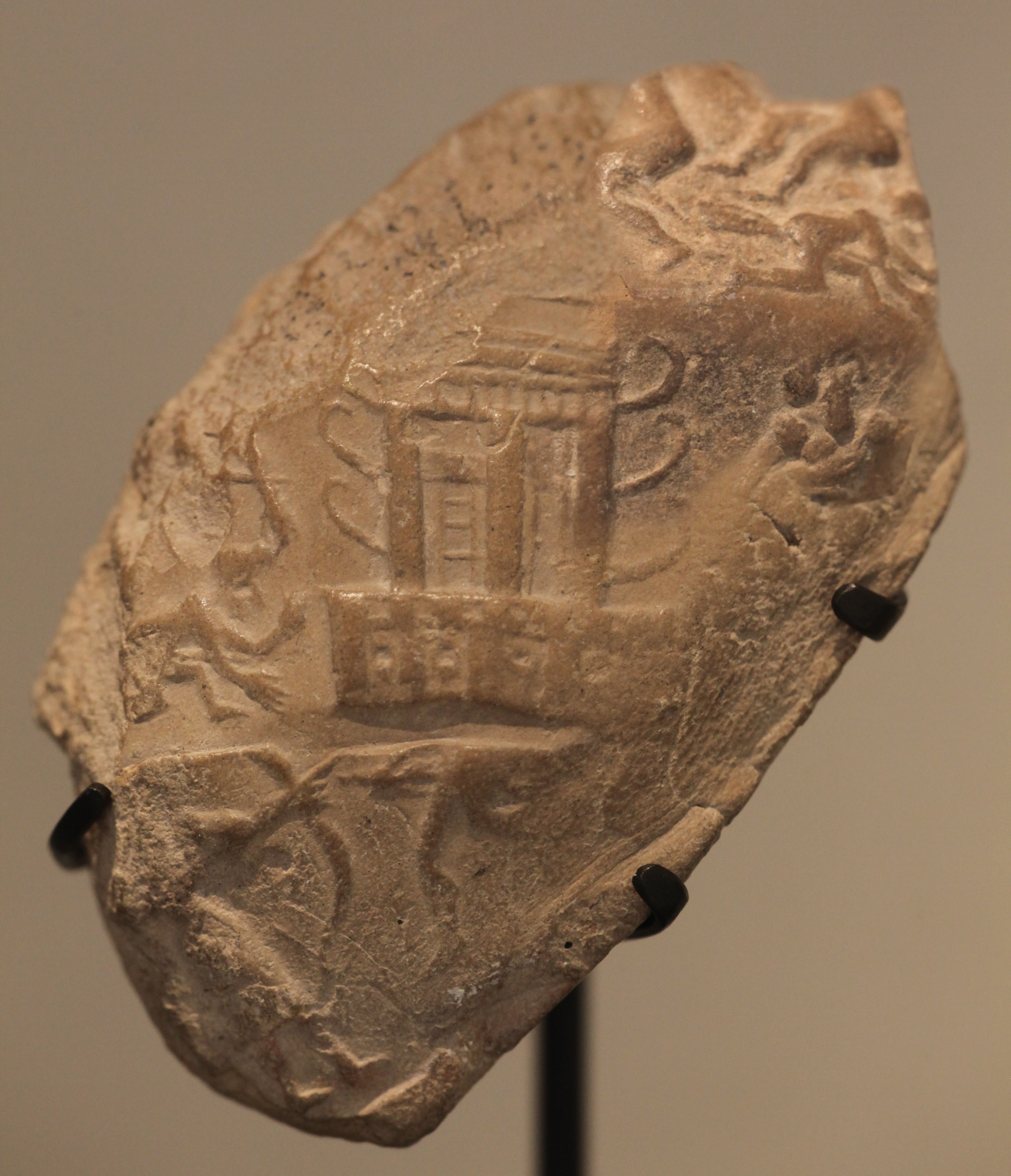
King-priest with bow fighting enemies, with horned temple in the center. Susa II or Uruk period (3800–3100 BC), found in excavations at Susa. Louvre Museum.

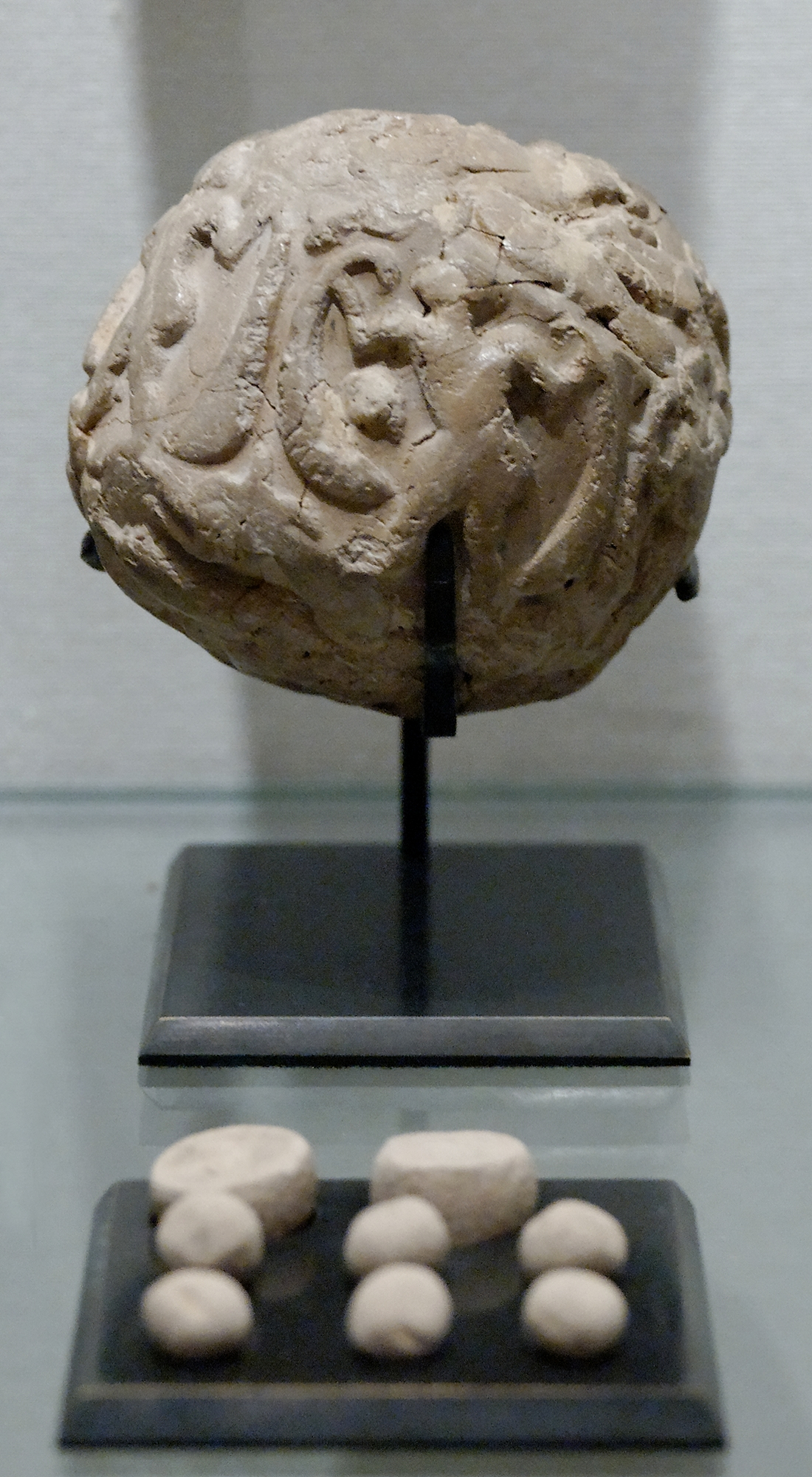
Globular envelope with the accounting tokens. Clay, Uruk period (c. 3500 BC). From the Tell of the Acropolis in Susa. The Louvre

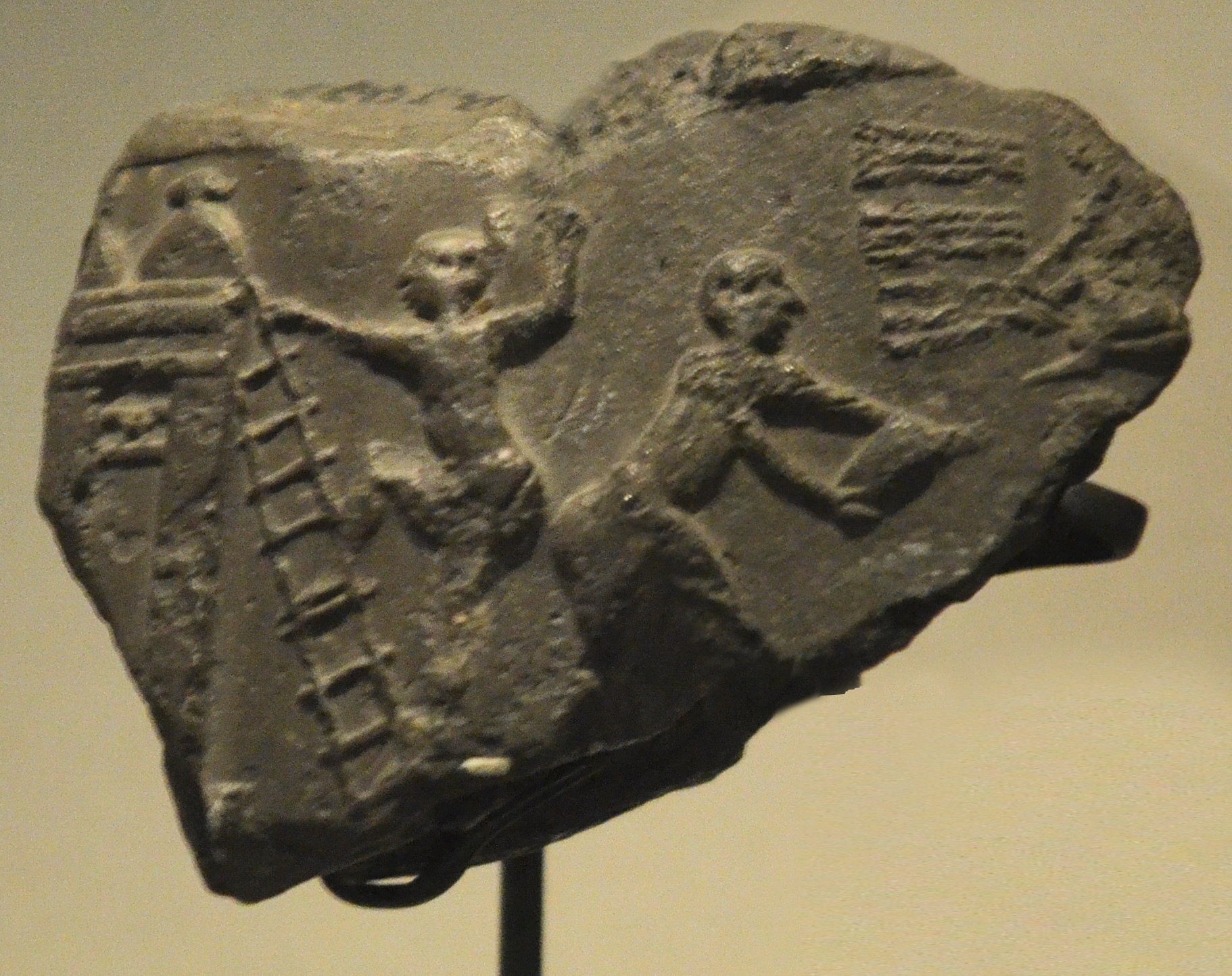
Work in the granaries, Susa II, Louvre.

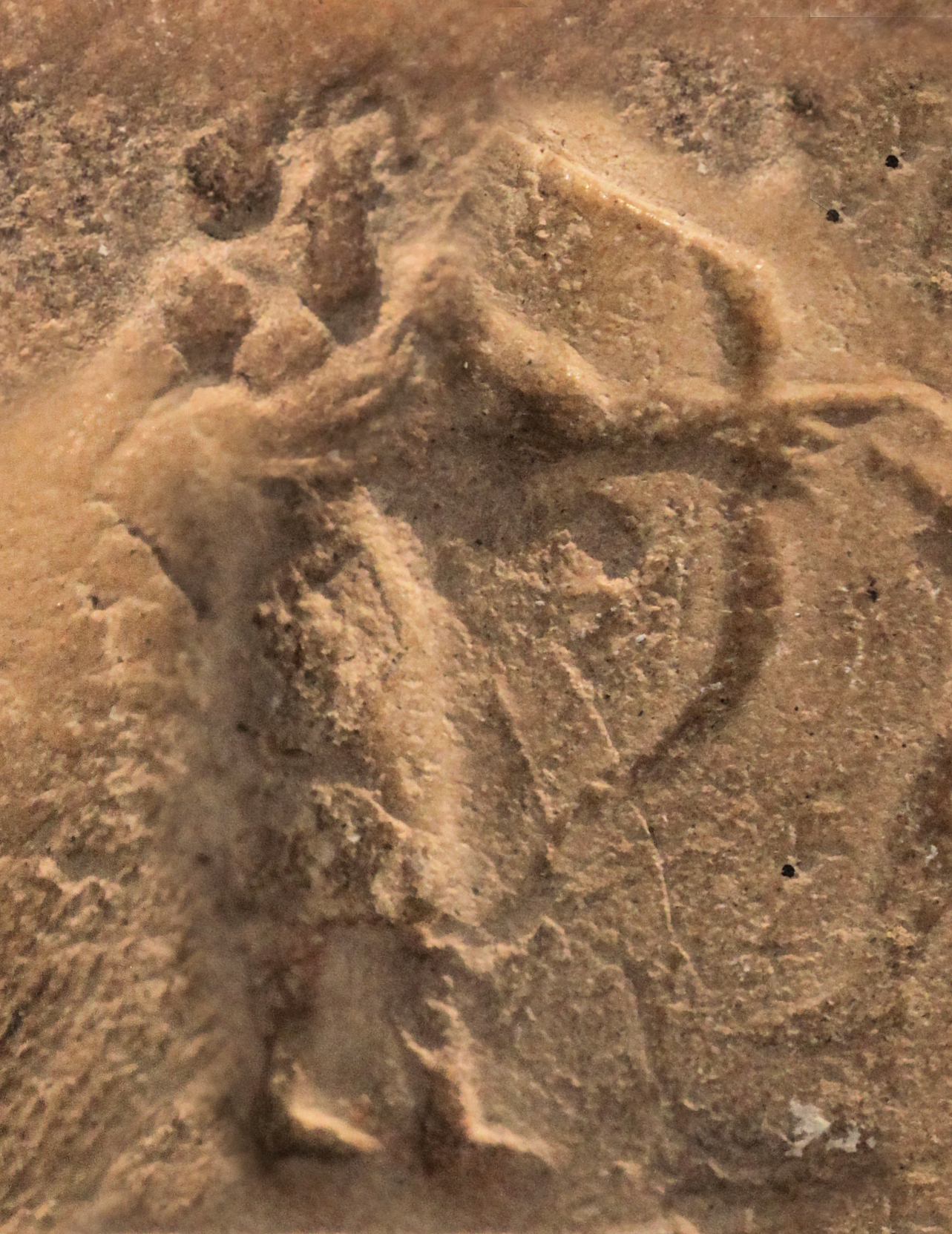
Priest-King with bow and arrows, Susa II, Louvre.

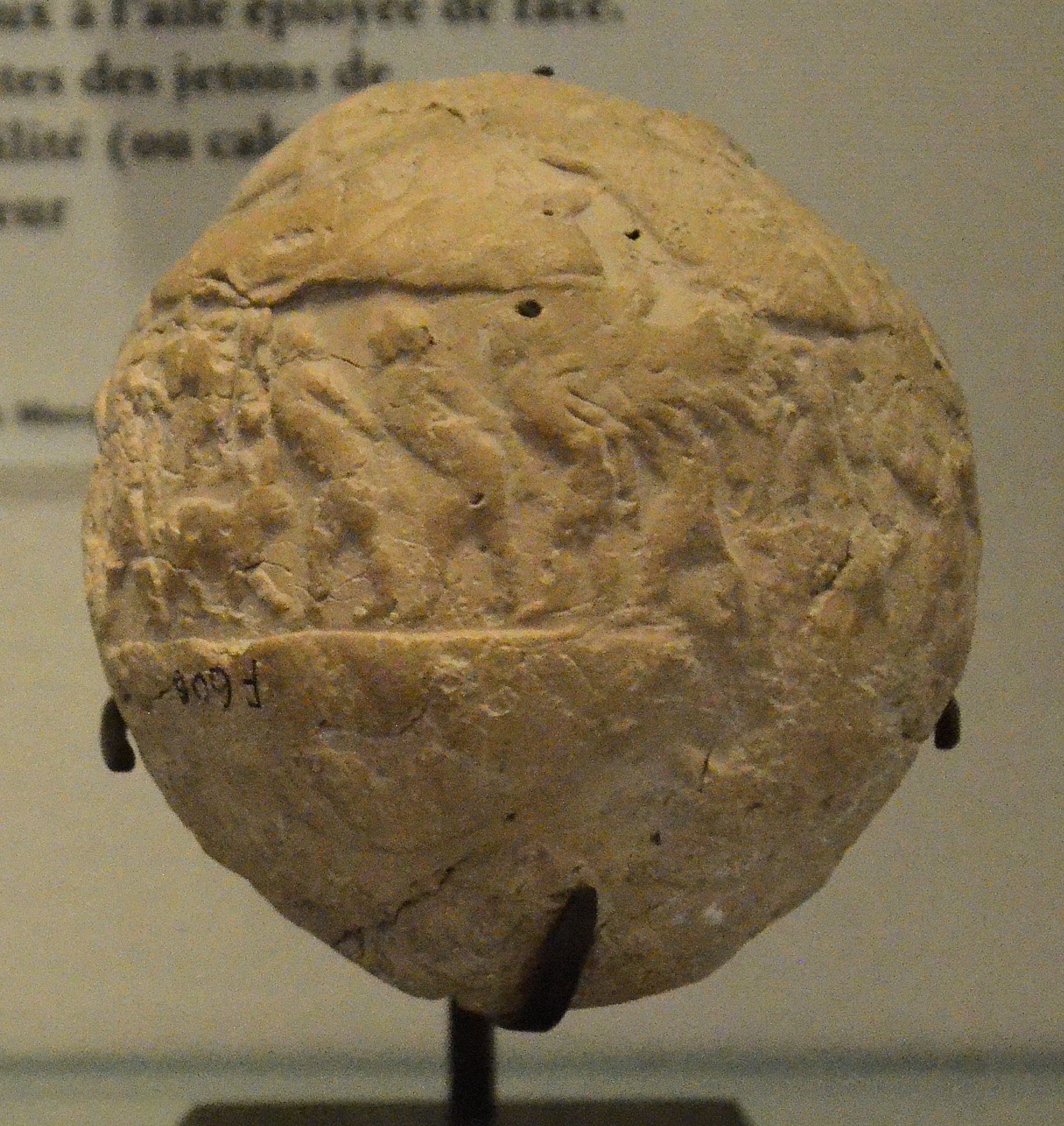
Prisoners, Susa II, Louvre.

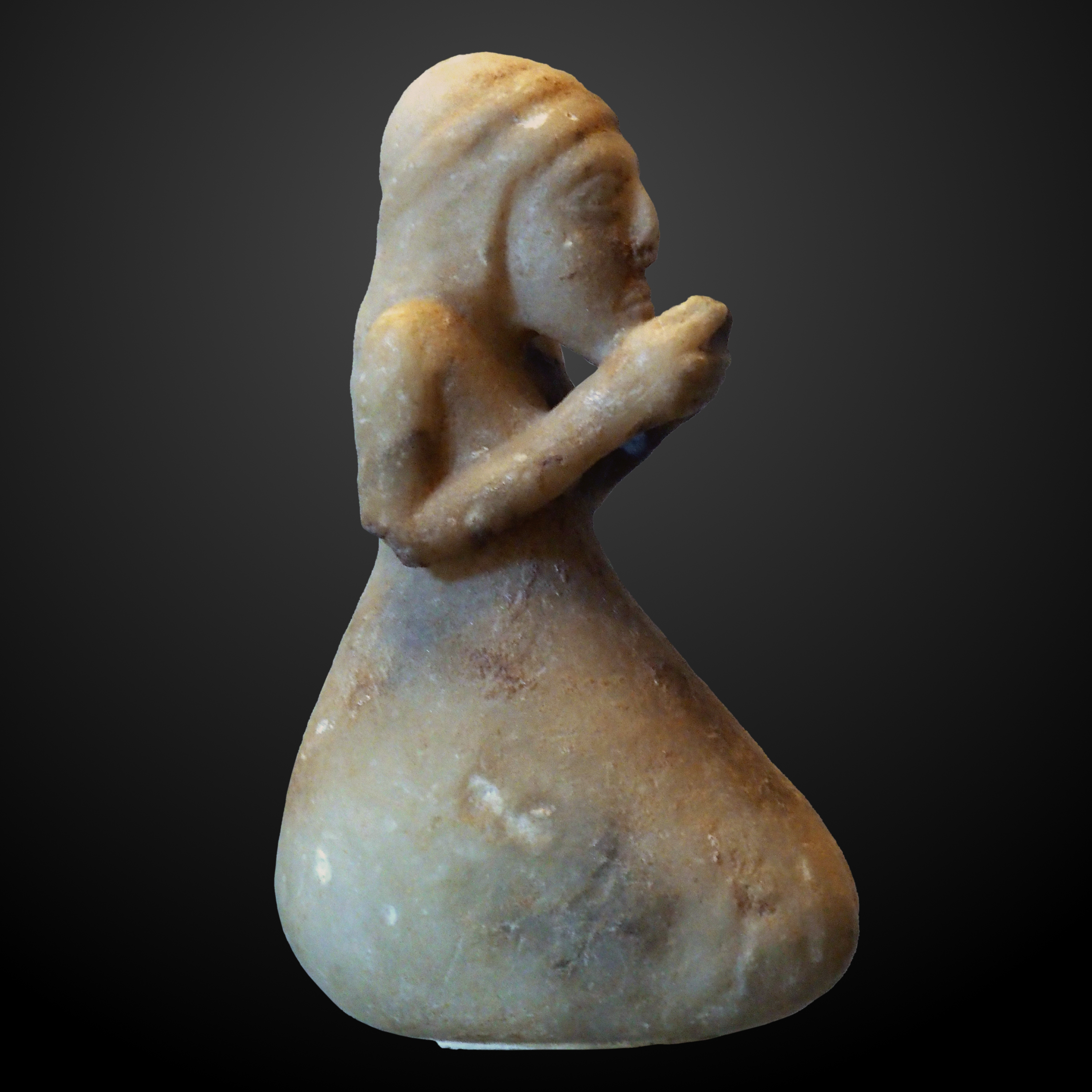
Orant statuette, Susa II, Louvre.

=== Susa III, or "Proto-Elamite", period (3100–2700 BC) ===
Susa III (3100–2700 BC) is also known as the 'Proto-Elamite' period. At this time, Banesh period pottery is predominant. This is also when the Proto-Elamite tablets first appear in the record. Subsequently, Susa became the centre of Elam civilization.

Ambiguous reference to Elam (Sumerian: 𒉏, romanized: NIM) appear also in this period in Sumerian records. Susa enters recorded history in the Early Dynastic period of Sumer. A battle between Kish and Susa is recorded in 2700 BC, when En-me-barage-si is said to have "made the land of Elam submit".

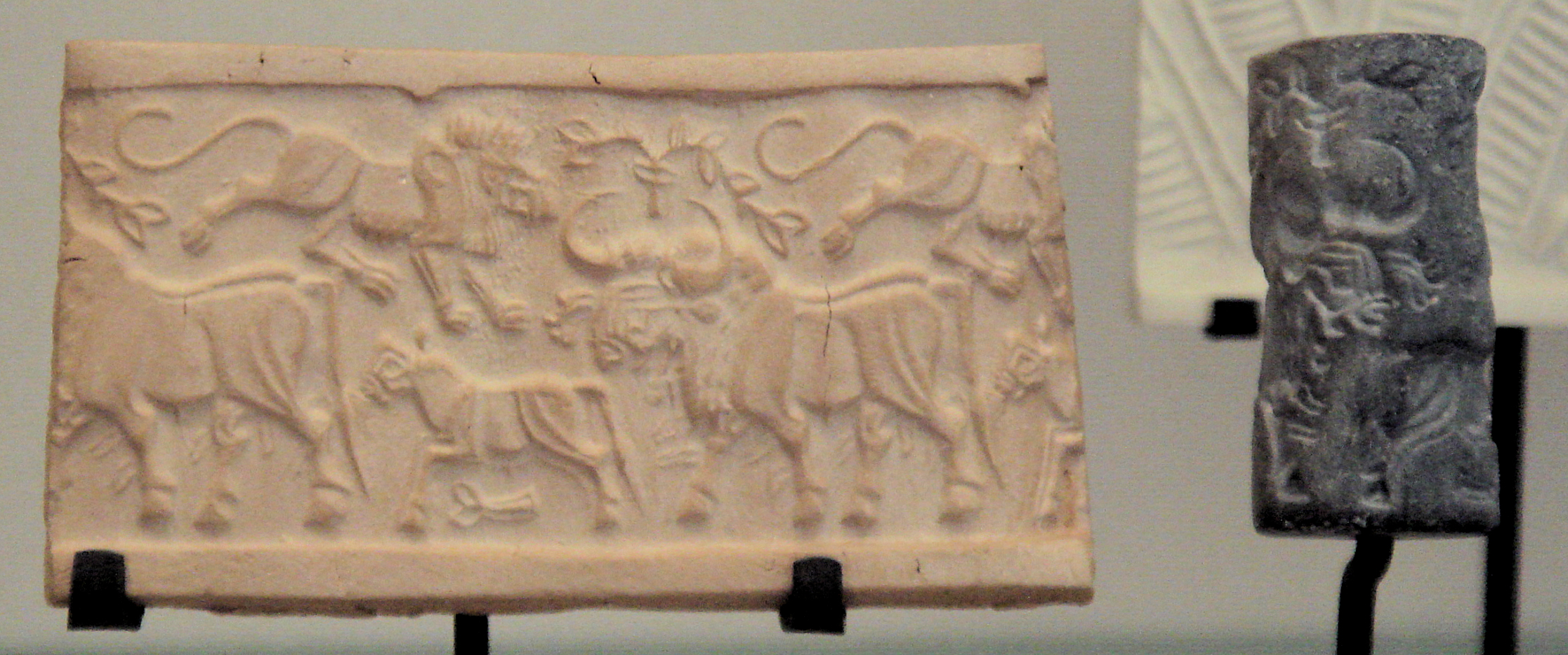
Susa III/ Proto-Elamite cylinder seal, 3150–2800 BC. Louvre Museum, reference Sb 1484

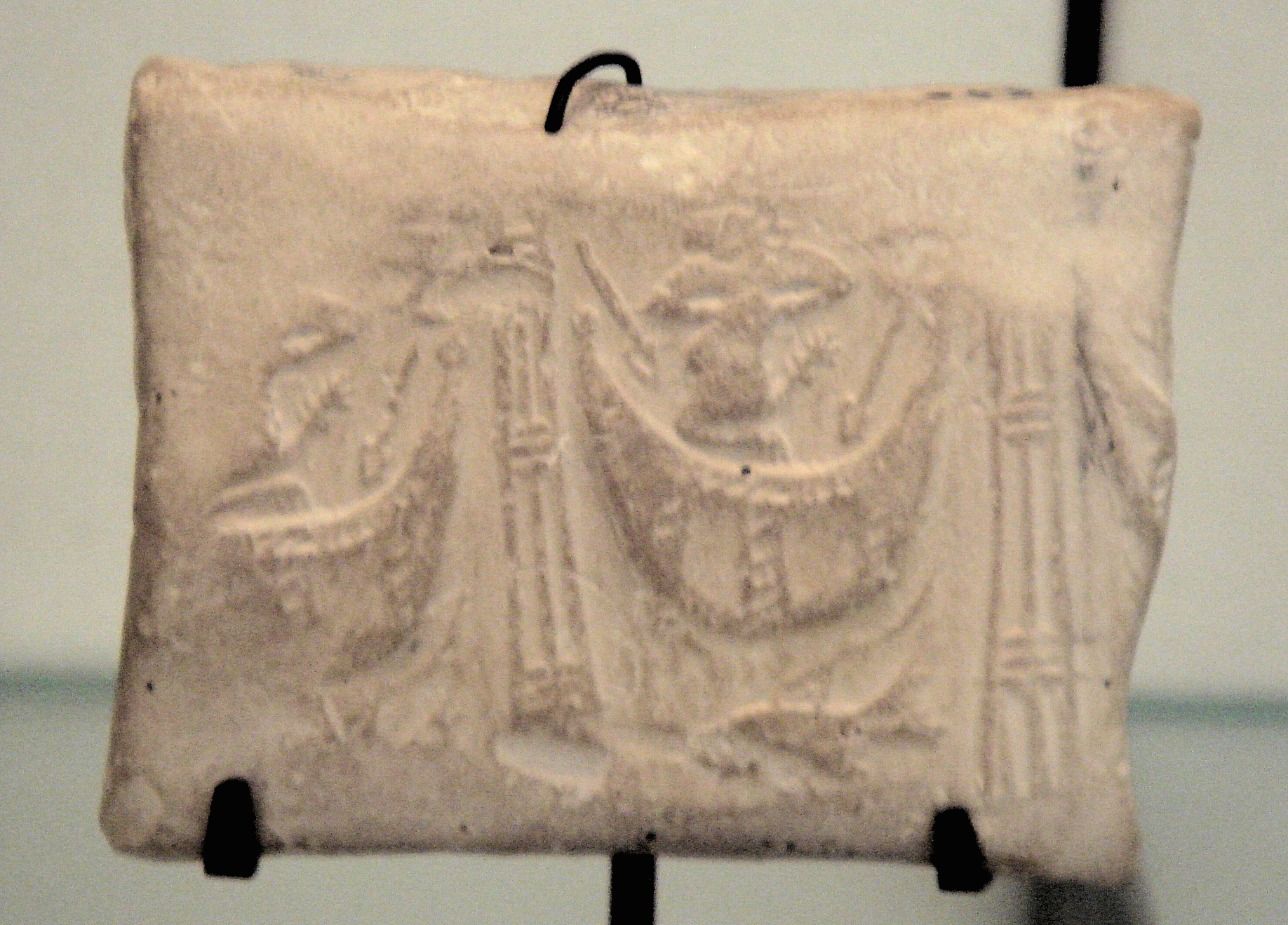
Susa III/ Proto-Elamite cylinder seal 3150–2800 BC Mythological being on a boat Louvre Museum Sb 6379

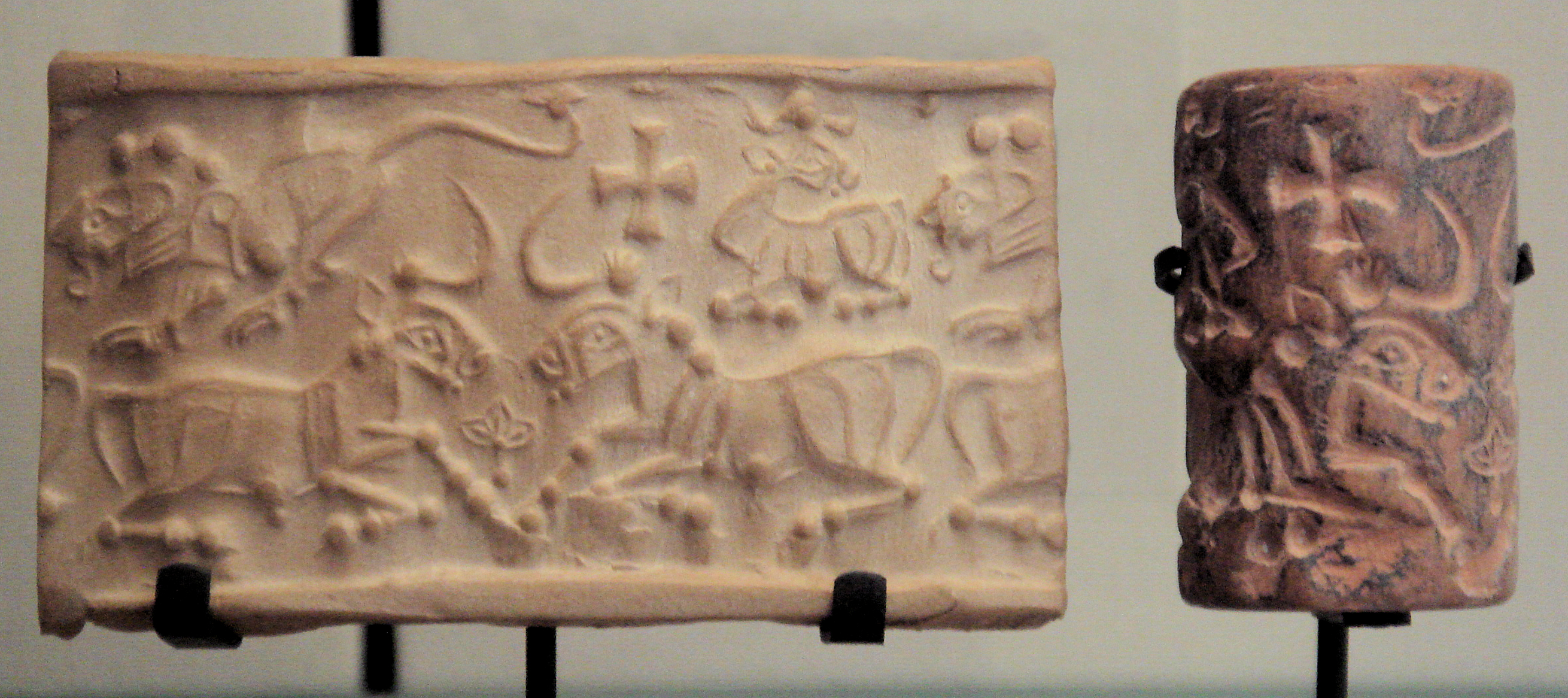
Susa III/ Proto-Elamite cylinder seal 3150–2800 BC Louvre Museum Sb 6166

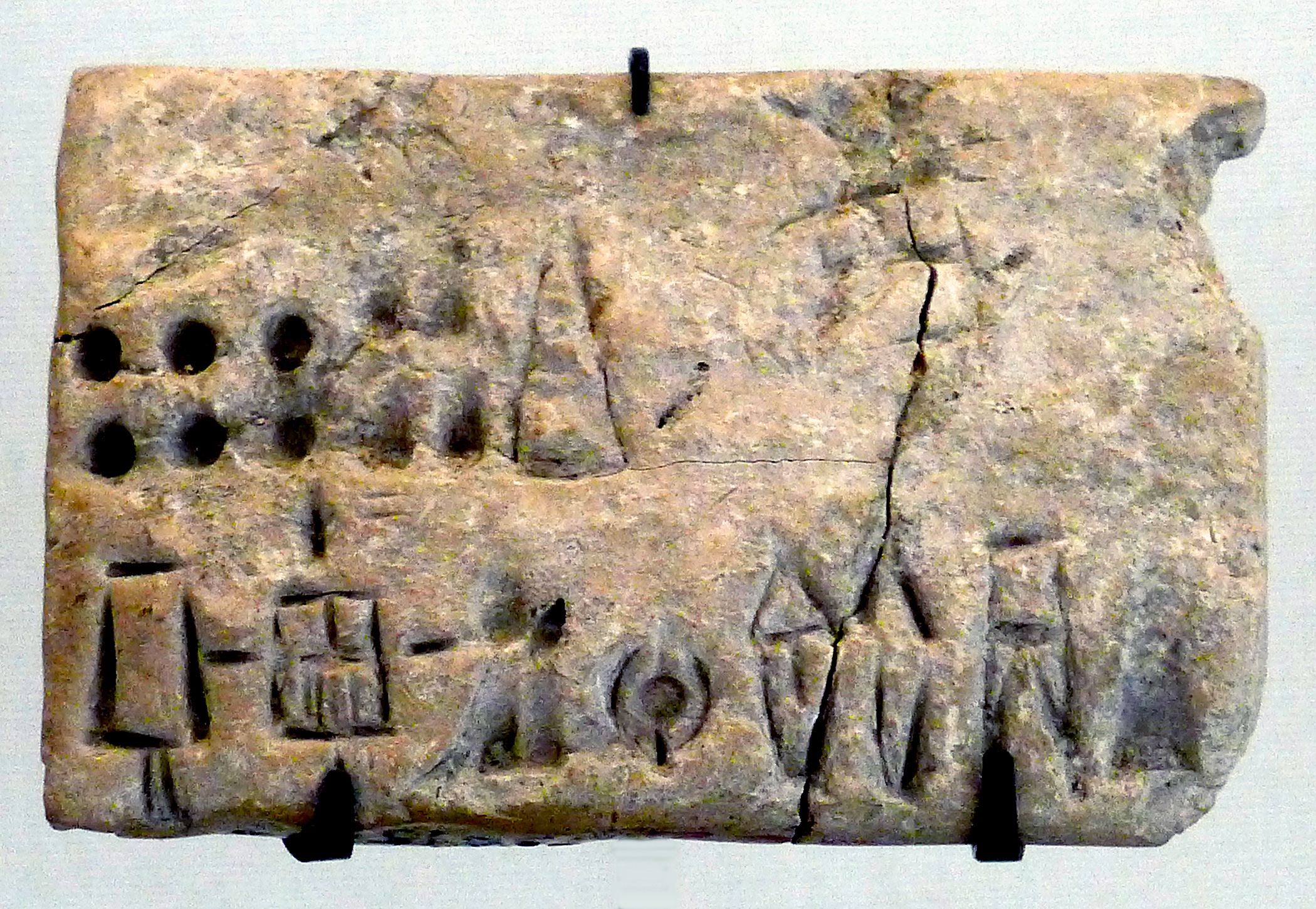
Economical tablet in Proto-Elamite script, Suse III, Louvre Museum, reference Sb 15200, circa 3100–2850 BC

=== Elamites ===
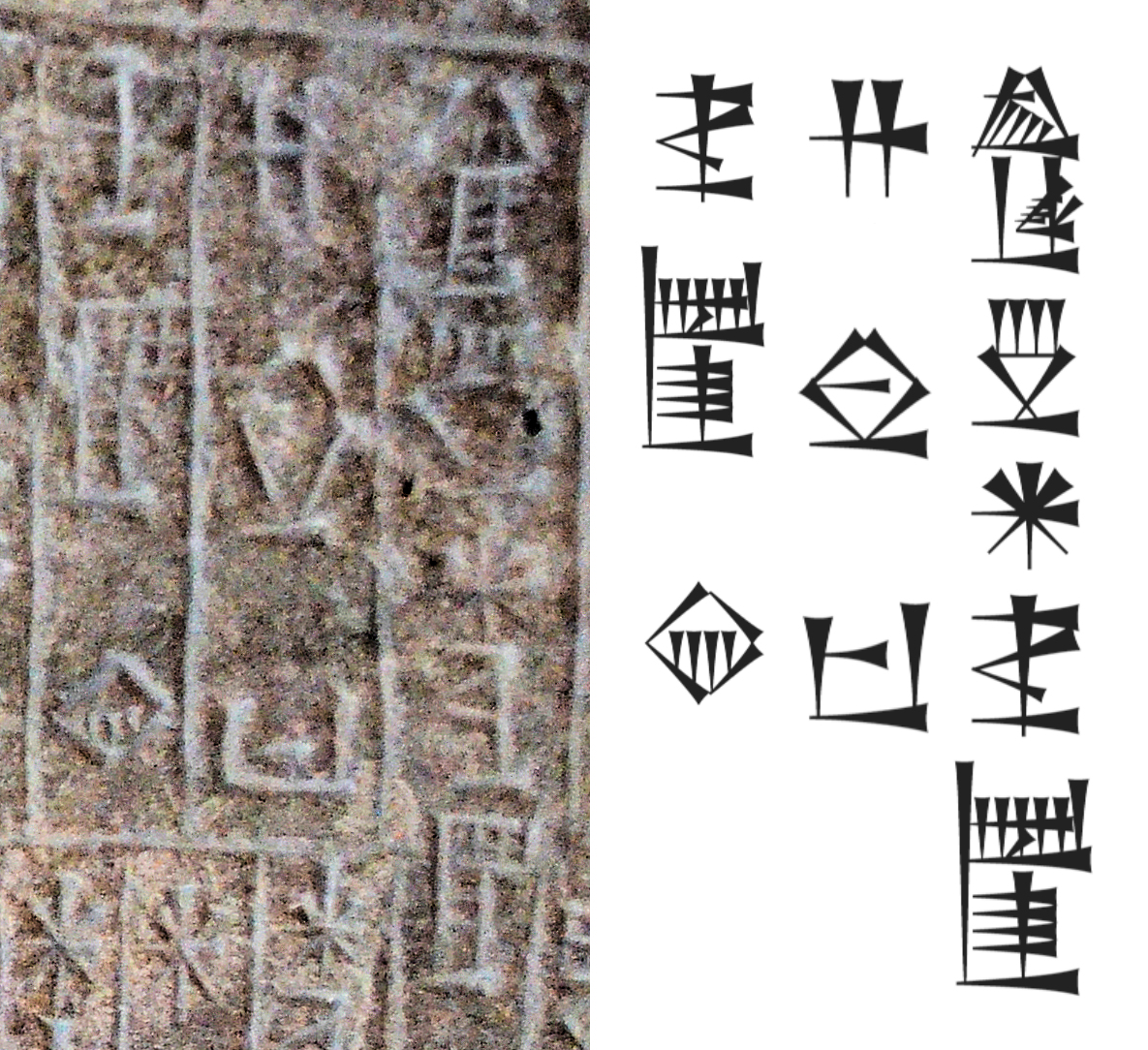
Puzur-Inshushinak Ensi Shushaki (𒅤𒊭𒀭𒈹𒂞 𒑐𒋼𒋛 𒈹𒂞𒆠), "Puzur-Inshushinak Ensi (Governor) of Susa", in the "Table au Lion", dated 2100 BC, Louvre Museum.

In the Sumerian period, Susa was the capital of a state called Susiana (Šušan), which occupied approximately the same territory of modern Khūzestān Province centered on the Karun River. Control of Susiana shifted between Elam, Sumer, and Akkad.

During the Elamite monarchy, many riches and materials were brought to Susa from the plundering of other cities. This was mainly due to the fact of Susa's location on Iran's South Eastern region, closer to the city of Babylon and cities in Mesopotamia.

The use of the Elamite language as an administrative language was first attested in texts of ancient Ansan, Tall-e Mal-yan, dated 1000 BC. Previous to the era of Elamites, the Akkadian language was responsible for most or all of the text used in ancient documents. Susiana was incorporated by Sargon the Great into his Akkadian Empire in approximately 2330 BC.

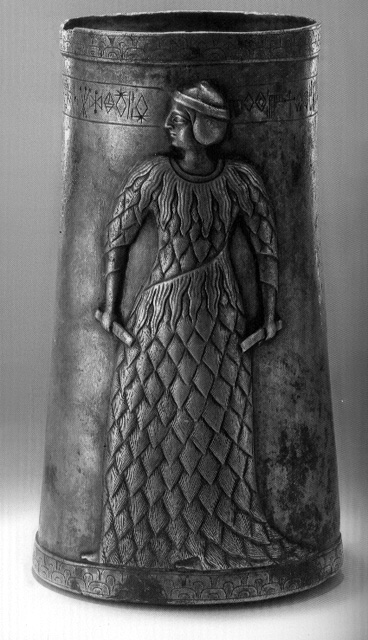
Silver cup from Marvdasht, Iran, with a linear-Elamite inscription from the time of Kutik-Inshushinak. National Museum of Iran

The main goddess of the city was Nanaya, who had a significant temple in Susa.

==== Old Elamite period (c. 2700–1500 BC) ====
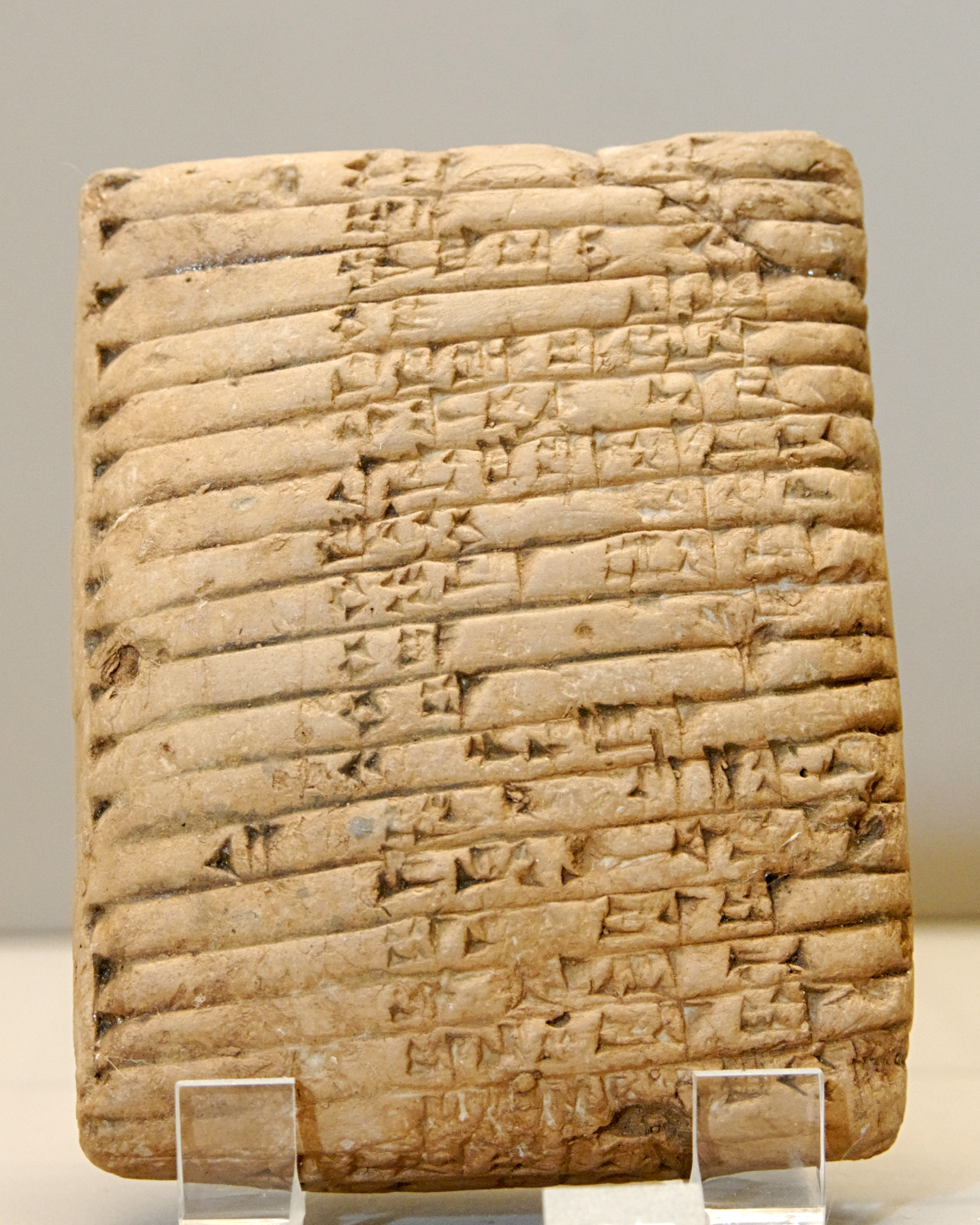
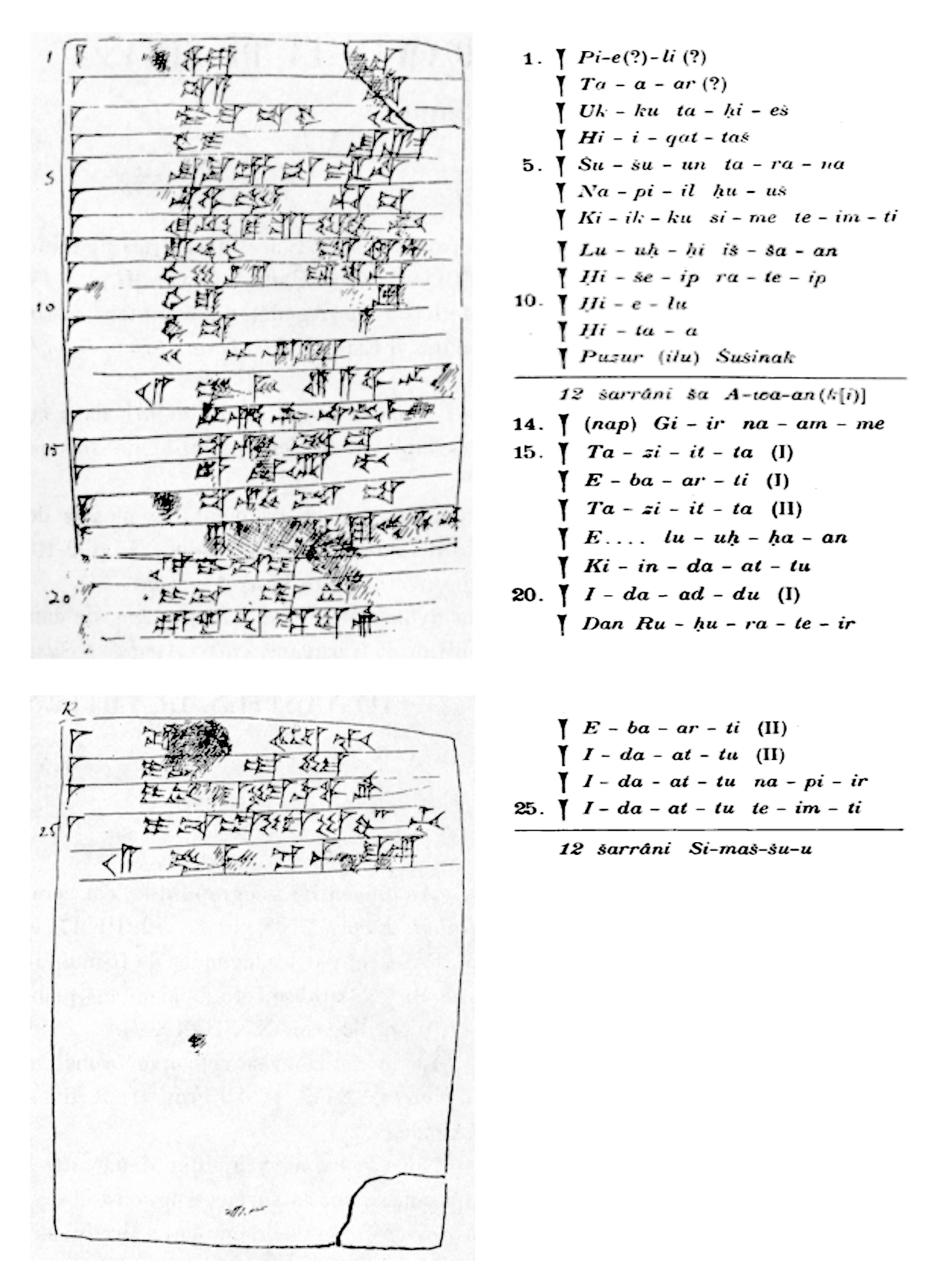
Dynastic list of twelve kings of Awan dynasty and twelve kings of the Shimashki Dynasty, 1800–1600 BC, Susa, Louvre Museum Sb 17729.

The Old Elamite period began around 2700 BC. Historical records mention the conquest of Elam by Enmebaragesi, the Sumerian king of Kish in Mesopotamia. Three dynasties ruled during this period. Twelve kings of each of the first two dynasties, those of Awan (or Avan; c. 2400–2100 BC) and Simashki (c. 2100–1970 BC), are known from a list from Susa dating to the Old Babylonian period. Two Elamite dynasties said to have exercised brief control over parts of Sumer in very early times include Awan and Hamazi; and likewise, several of the stronger Sumerian rulers, such as Eannatum of Lagash and Lugal-anne-mundu of Adab, are recorded as temporarily dominating Elam.

==== Kutik-Inshushinak ====
Susa was the capital of an Akkadian province until ca. 2100 BC, when its governor, Kutik-Inshushinak, rebelled and made it an independent state and a literary center. Also, he was the last from the Awan dynasty according to the Susa kinglist. He unified the neighbouring territories and became the king of Elam. He encouraged the use of the Linear Elamite script, that remains undeciphered.

The city was subsequently conquered by the neo-Sumerian Third Dynasty of Ur and held until Ur finally collapsed at the hands of the Elamites under Kindattu in ca. 2004 BC. At this time, Susa was ruled by Elam again and became its capital under the Shimashki dynasty.

=== Indus-Susa relations (2400–2100 BC) ===
Numerous artifacts of Indus Valley civilization origin have been found in Susa from this period, especially seals and etched carnelian beads, pointing to Indus-Mesopotamia relations during this period.

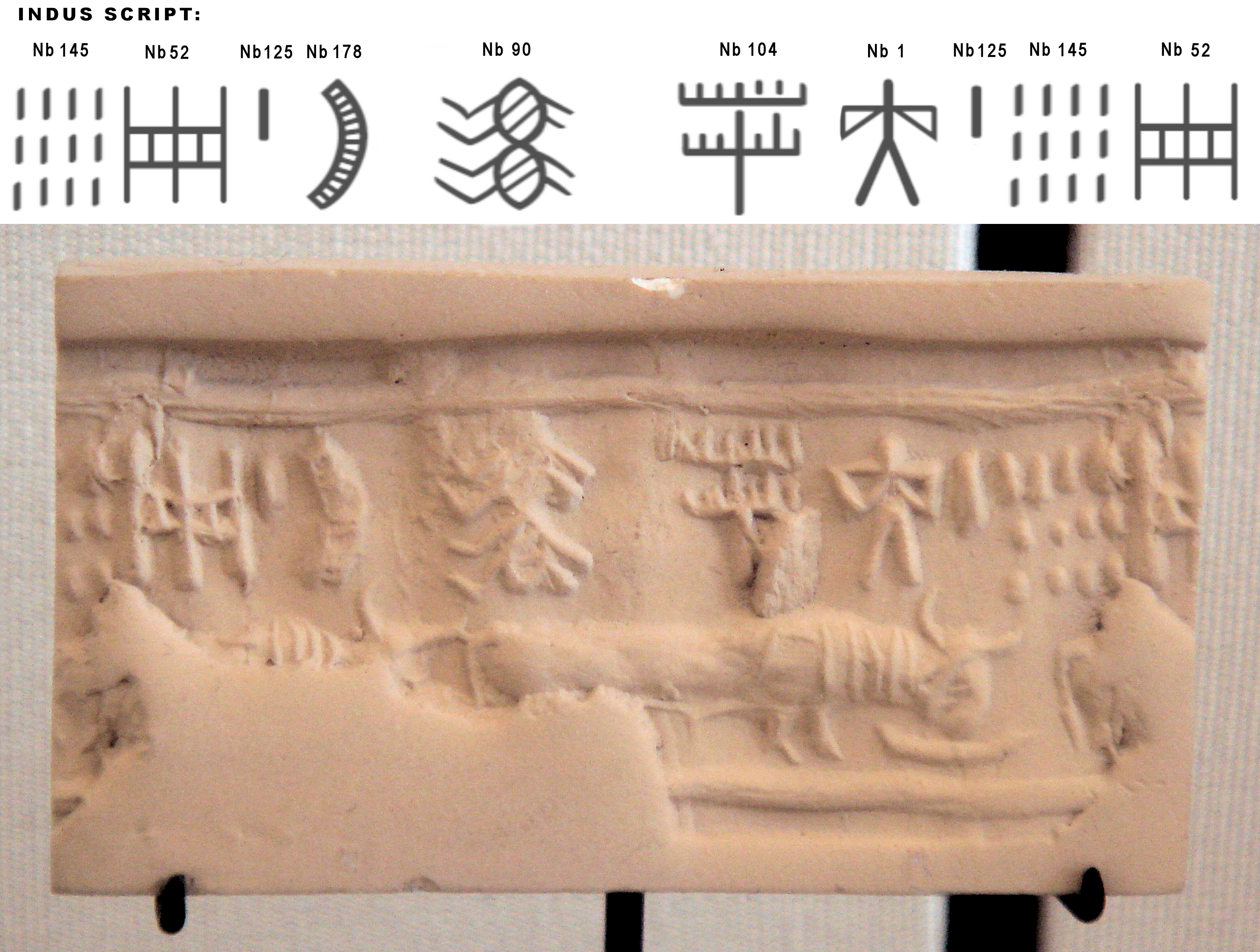
Impression of an Indus cylinder seal discovered in Susa, in strata dated to 2400–2100 BC. Elongated buffalo with line of standard Indus script signs. Tell of the Susa acropolis. Louvre Museum, reference Sb 2425. Indus script numbering convention per Asko Parpola.

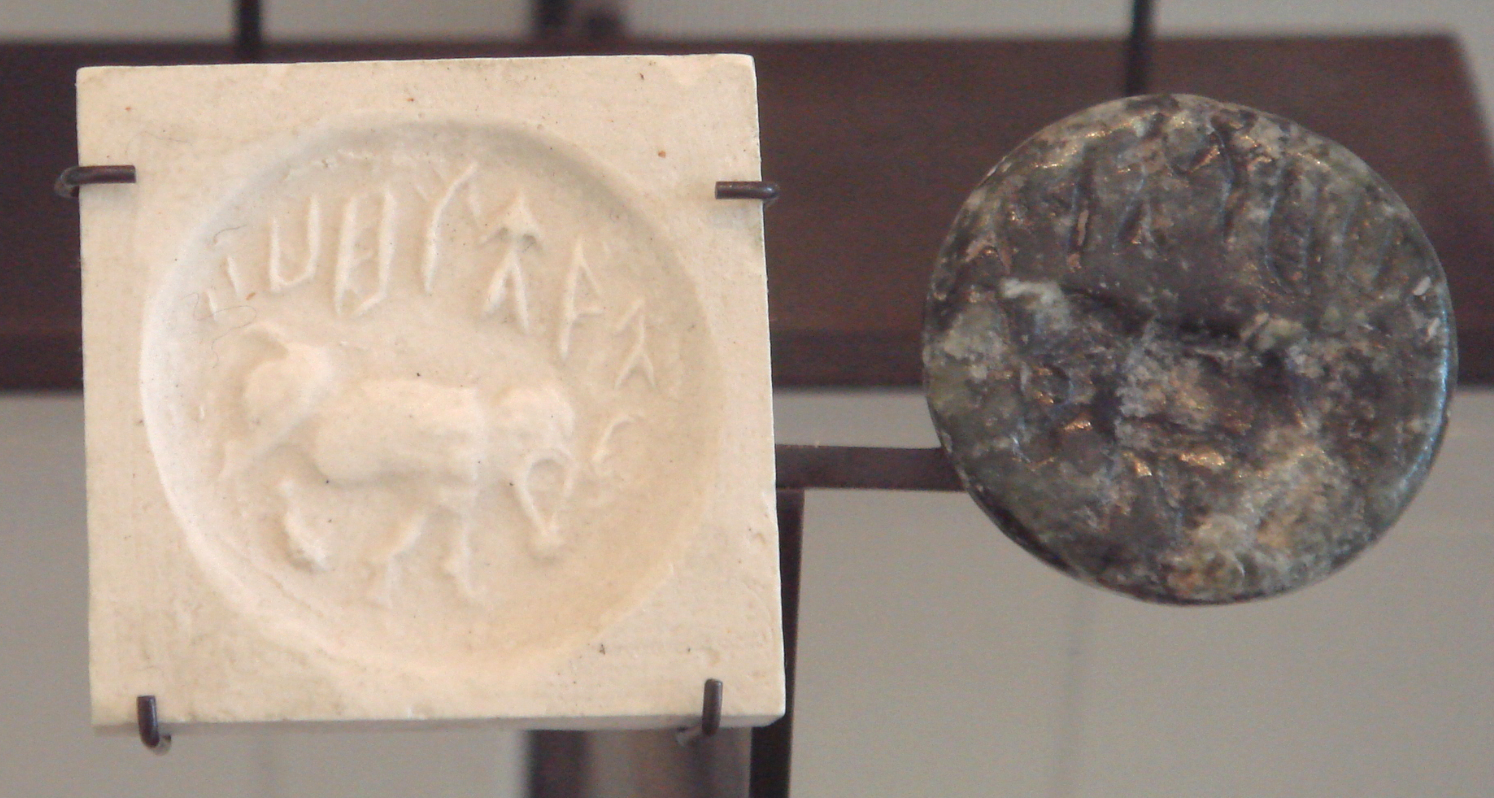
Indus round seal with impression. Elongated buffalo with Harappan script imported to Susa in 2340–2200 BC. Found in the tell of the Susa acropolis. Louvre Museum, reference Sb 5614

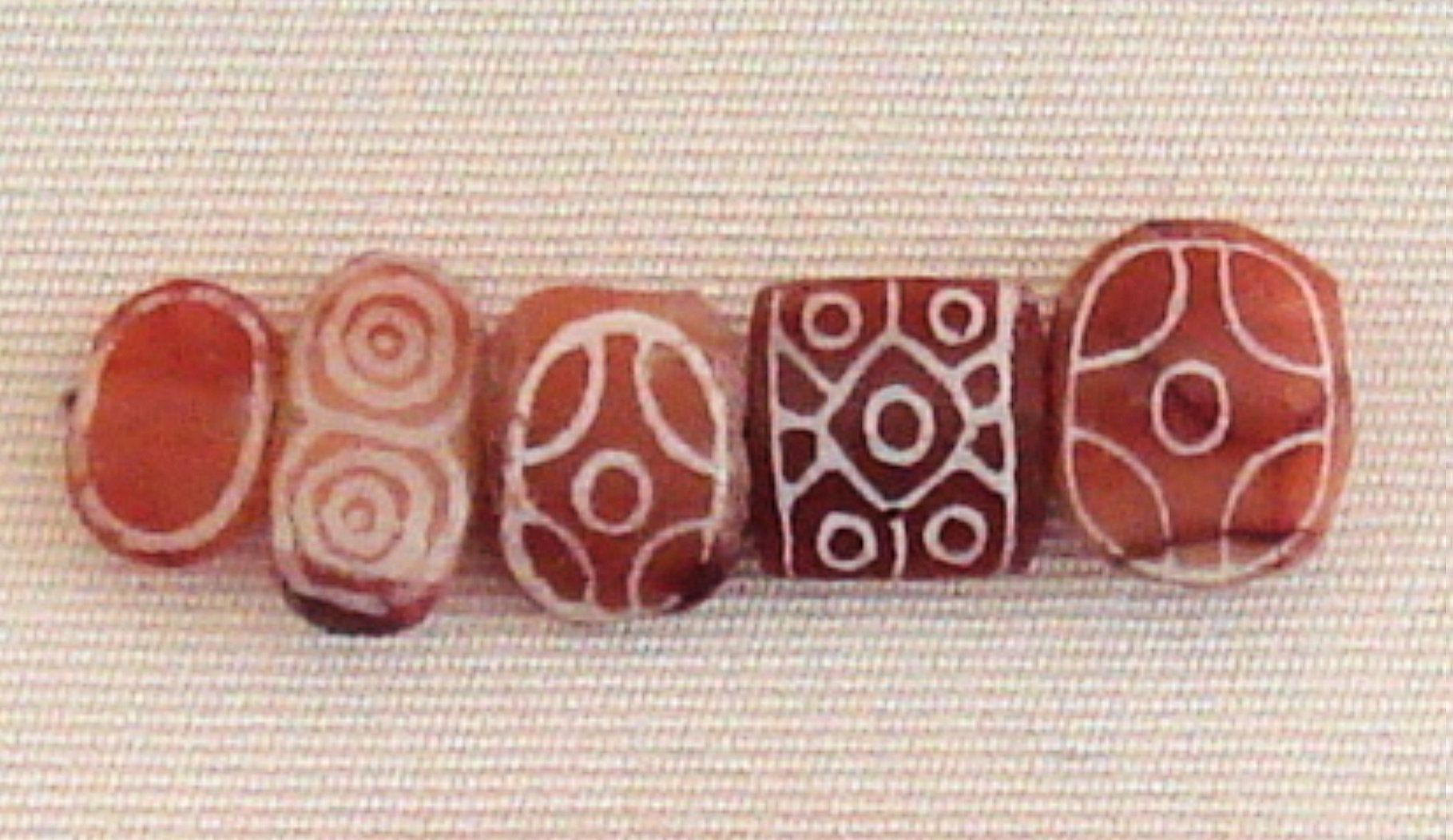
Indian carnelian beads with white design, etched in white with an alkali through a heat process, imported to Susa in 2400–2100 BC. Found in the tell of the Susa acropolis. Louvre Museum, reference Sb 17751. These beads are identical with beads found in the Indus Civilization site of Dholavira.

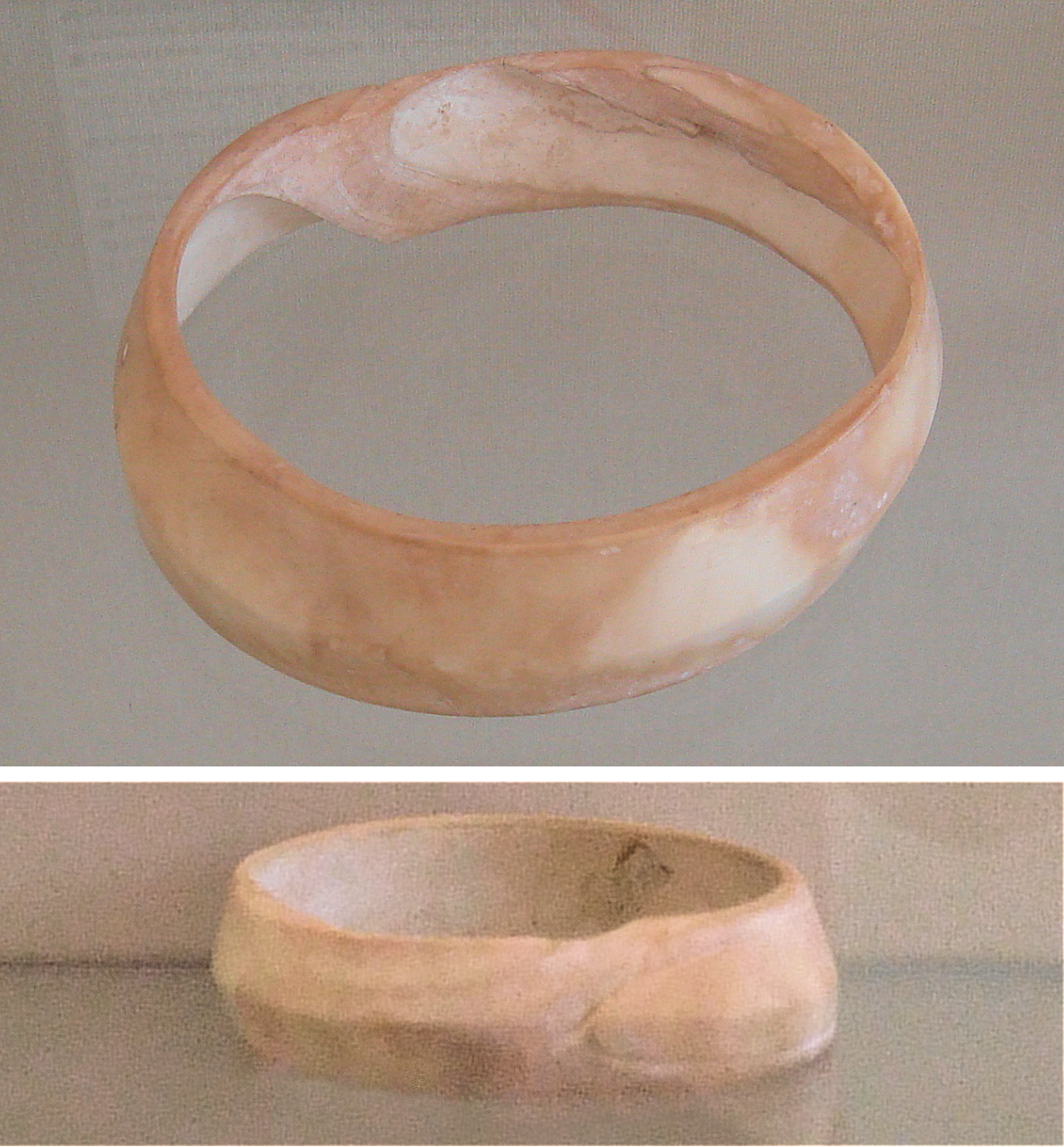
Indus bracelet, front and back, made of Pleuroploca trapezium or Turbinella pyrum imported to Susa in 2400–2100 BC. Found in the tell of the Susa acropolis. Louvre Museum, reference Sb 14473. This type of bracelet was manufactured in Mohenjo-daro, Lothal and Balakot. The back is engraved with an oblong chevron design which is typical of shell bangles of the Indus Civilization.

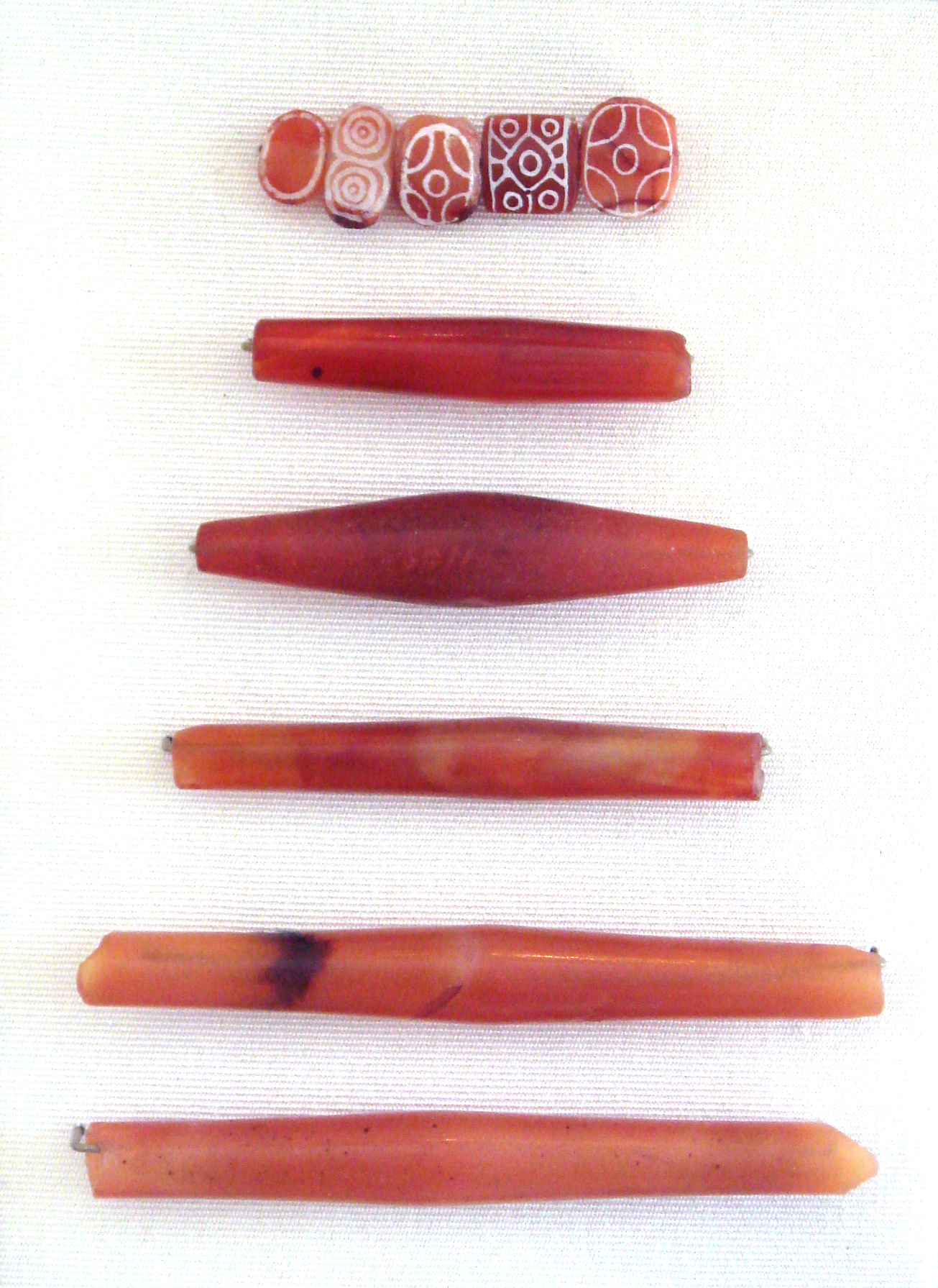
Indus Valley Civilization carnelian beads excavated in Susa.

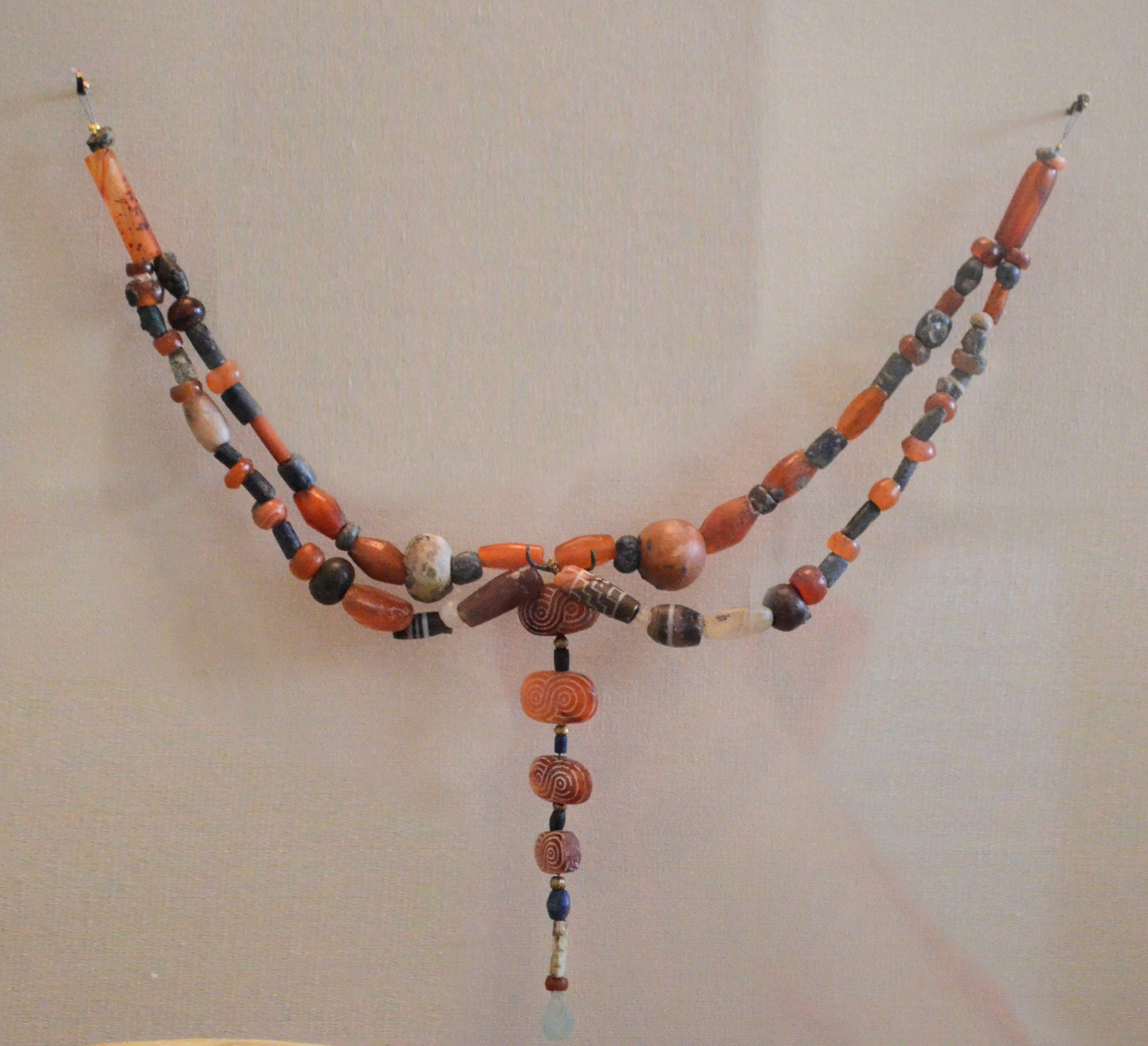
Jewelry with components from the Indus, Central Asia and Northern-eastern Iran found in Susa dated to 2400–2100 BC. Louvre - SB 13099; N 601.

==== Middle Elamite period (c. 1500–1100 BC) ====
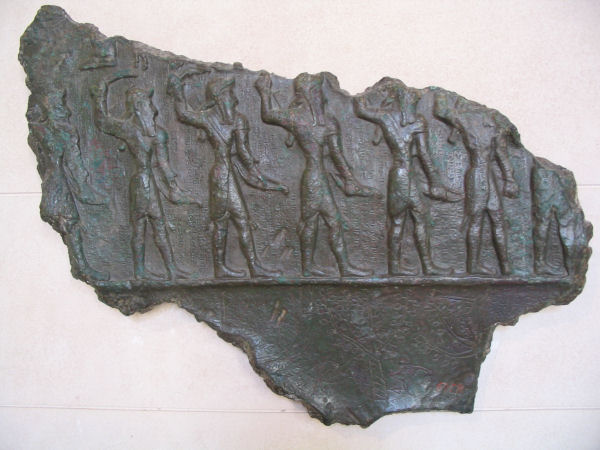
Middle-Elamite basrelief of warrior gods, Susa, 1600–1100 BC

Around 1500 BC, the Middle Elamite period began with the rise of the Anshanite dynasties. Their rule was characterized by an "Elamisation" of Susa, and the kings took the title "king of Anshan and Susa". While, previously, the Akkadian language was frequently used in inscriptions, the succeeding kings, such as the Igihalkid dynasty of c. 1400 BC, tried to use Elamite. Thus, Elamite language and culture grew in importance in Susiana.

This was also the period when the Elamite pantheon was being imposed in Susiana. This policy reached its height with the construction of the political and religious complex at Chogha Zanbil, 30 km (19 mi) south-east of Susa.

In ca. 1175 BC, the Elamites under Shutruk-Nahhunte plundered the original stele bearing the Code of Hammurabi and took it to Susa. Archeologists found it in 1901. Nebuchadnezzar I of the Babylonian empire plundered Susa around fifty years later.

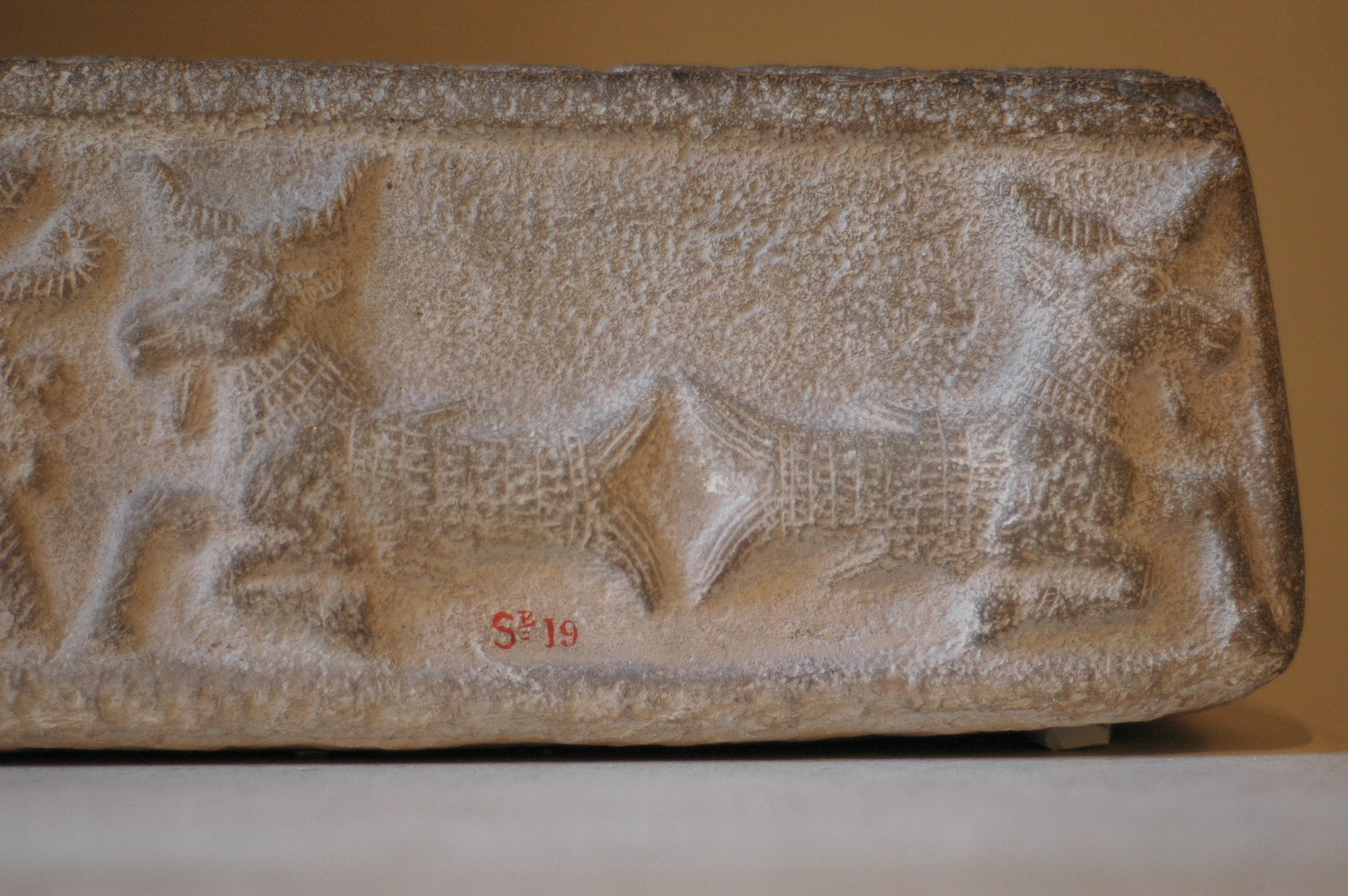
An ornate design on this limestone ritual vat from the Middle Elamite period depicts creatures with the heads of goats and the tails of fish, Susa, 1500–1110 BC.

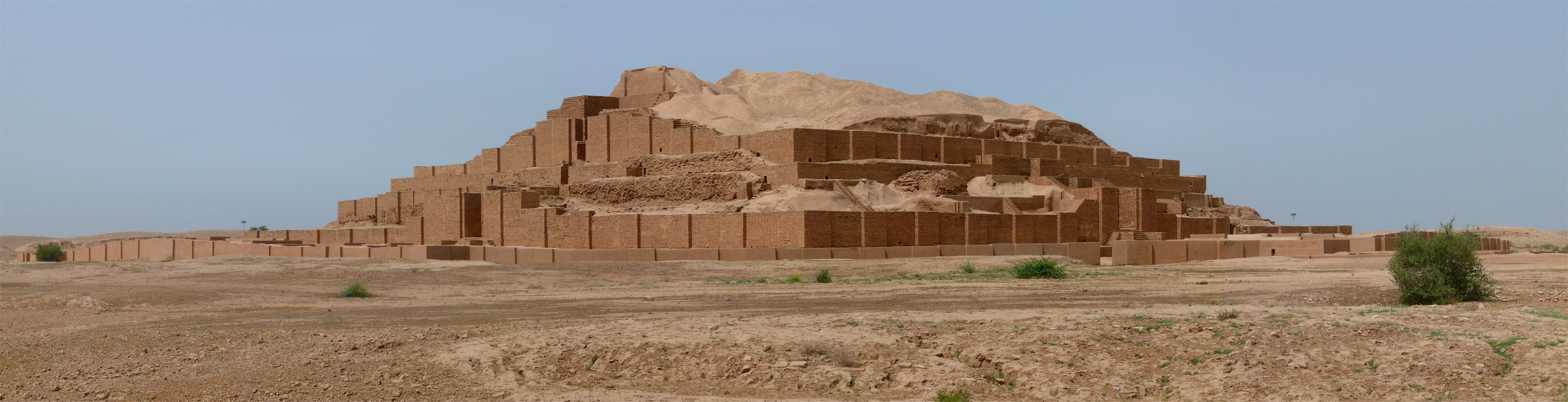
The Ziggurat at Chogha Zanbil was built by Elamite king Untash-Napirisha circa 1300 BC.

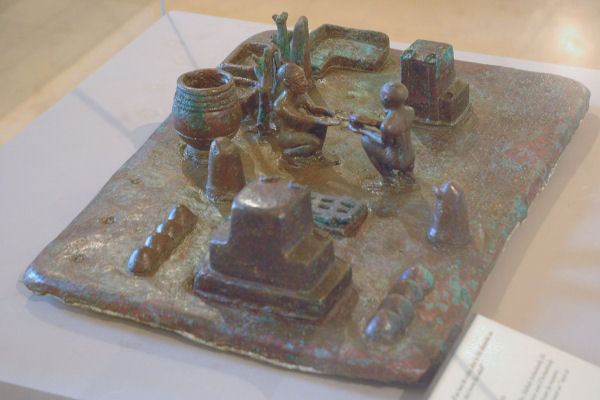
Susa, Middle-Elamite model of a sun ritual, circa 1150 BC

==== Neo-Elamite period (c. 1100–540 BC) ====
===== Neo-Assyrians =====
In 647 BC, Neo-Assyrian king Ashurbanipal leveled the city during a war in which the people of Susa participated on the other side. A tablet unearthed in 1854 by Austen Henry Layard in Nineveh reveals Ashurbanipal as an "avenger", seeking retribution for the humiliations that the Elamites had inflicted on the Mesopotamians over the centuries:

"Susa, the great holy city, abode of their gods, seat of their mysteries, I conquered. I entered its palaces, I opened their treasuries where silver and gold, goods and wealth were amassed. . . .I destroyed the ziggurat of Susa. I smashed its shining copper horns. I reduced the temples of Elam to naught; their gods and goddesses I scattered to the winds. The tombs of their ancient and recent kings I devastated, I exposed to the sun, and I carried away their bones toward the land of Ashur. I devastated the provinces of Elam and, on their lands, I sowed salt."

Assyrian rule of Susa began in 647 BC and lasted till Median capture of Susa in 617 BC.

=== Achaemenid period ===
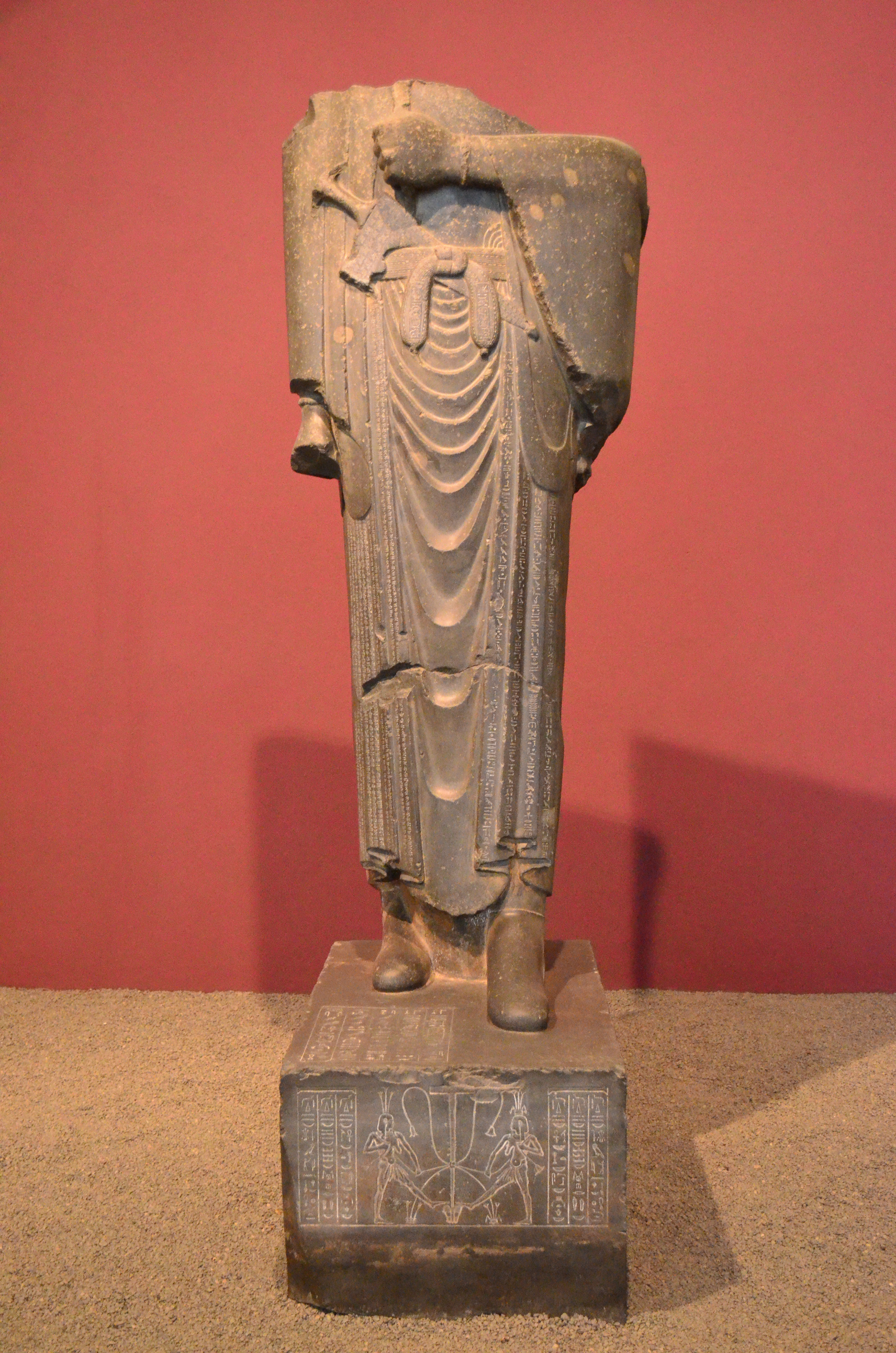
Statue of Darius the Great, National Museum of Iran

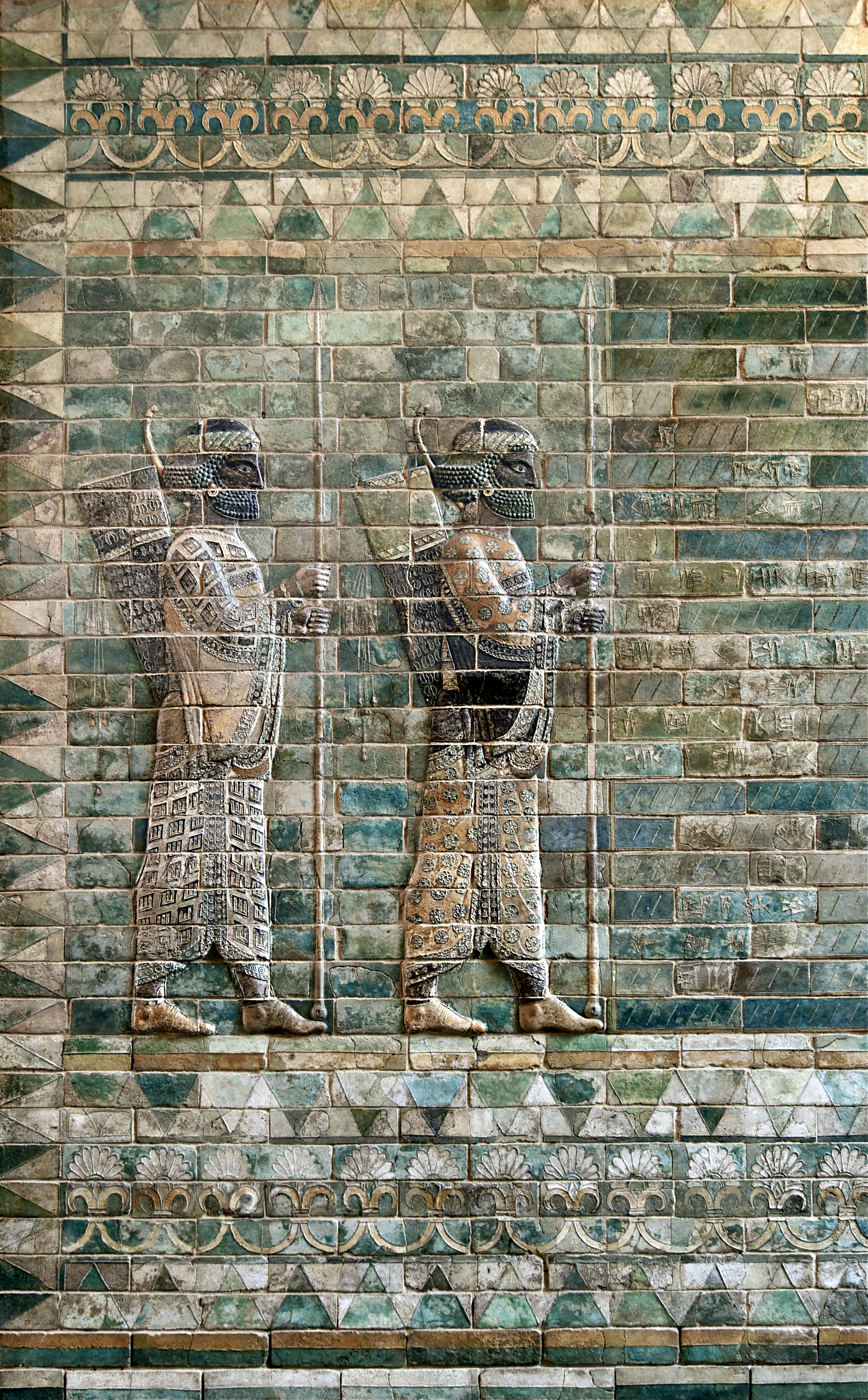
Archers frieze from Darius' palace at Susa. Detail of the beginning of the frieze

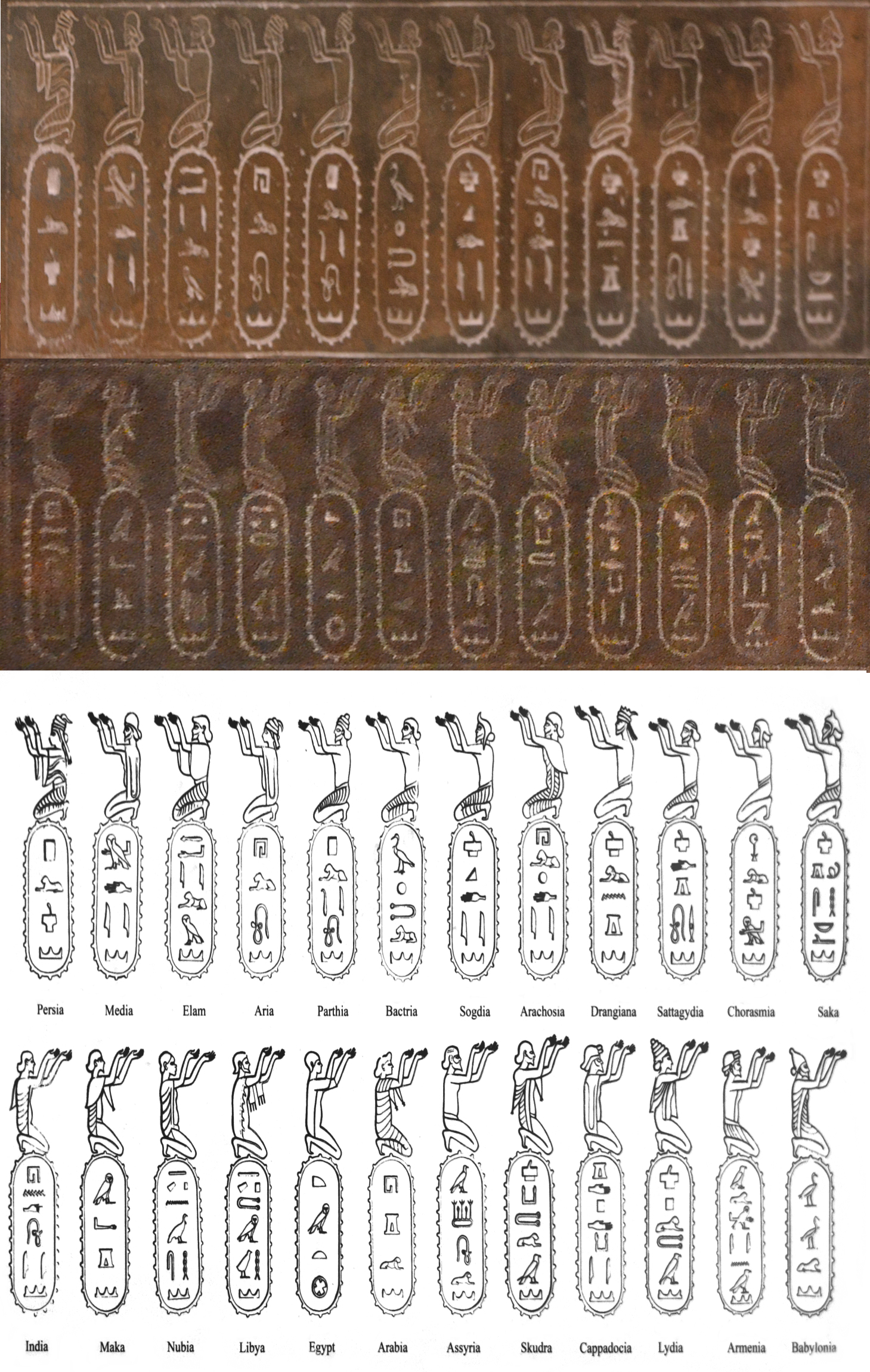
The 24 countries subject to the Achaemenid Empire at the time of Darius the Great, on the base of his Statue.

Susa underwent a major political and ethnocultural transition when it became part of the Persian Achaemenid Empire between 540 and 539 BC when it was captured by Cyrus the Great during his conquest of Elam (Susiana), of which Susa was the capital. The Nabonidus Chronicle records that, prior to the battle(s), Nabonidus had ordered cult statues from outlying Babylonian cities to be brought into the capital, suggesting that the conflict over Susa had begun possibly in the winter of 540 BC.

It is probable that Cyrus negotiated with the Babylonian generals to obtain a compromise on their part and therefore avoid an armed confrontation. Nabonidus was staying in the city at the time and soon fled to the capital, Babylon, which he had not visited in years. Cyrus' conquest of Susa and the rest of Babylonia commenced a fundamental shift, bringing Susa under Persian control for the first time. Strabo stated that Cyrus made Susa an imperial capital though there was no new construction in that period so this is in dispute.

Under Cyrus' son Cambyses II, Susa became a center of political power as one of four capitals of the Achaemenid Persian empire, while reducing the significance of Pasargadae as the capital of Persis. Following Cambyses' brief rule, Darius the Great began a major building program in Susa and Persepolis, which included building a large palace. During this time he describes his new capital in an inscription:

"This palace which I built at Susa, from afar its ornamentation was brought. Downward the earth was dug, until I reached rock in the earth. When the excavation had been made, then rubble was packed down, some 40 cubits in depth, another part 20 cubits in depth. On that rubble the palace was constructed."

The city forms the setting of The Persians (472 BC), an Athenian tragedy by the ancient Greek playwright Aeschylus that is the oldest surviving play in the history of theatre.

The Book of Esther, which is the basis for the Jewish holiday of Purim, is said to have occurred in Susa during the Achaemenid period. The King Ahasuerus mentioned in that book may refer to Xerxes I (486-465 BC).

=== Seleucid period ===
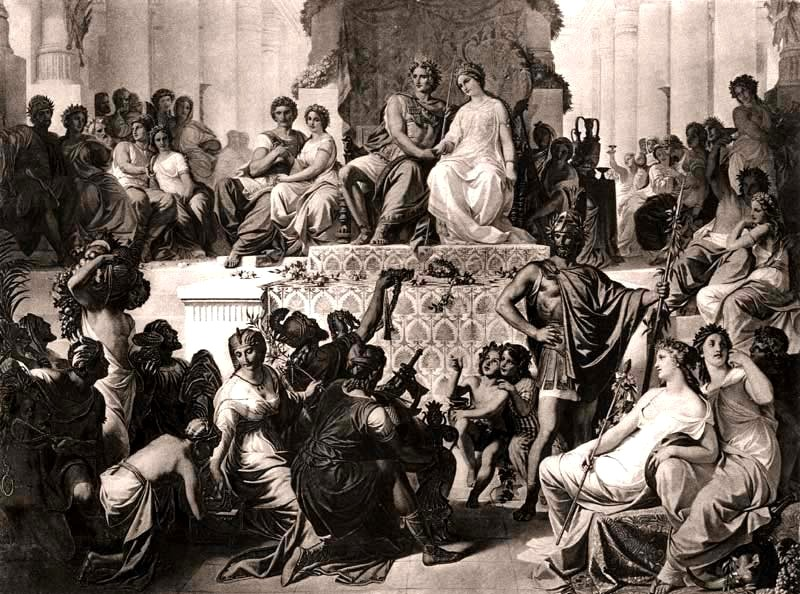
The marriages of Stateira II to Alexander the Great of Macedon and her sister, Drypteis, to Hephaestion at Susa in 324 BC, as depicted in a late-19th-century engraving.

Alexander the Great invaded the Achaemenid empire and the satrap of Susa surrendered to him. Susa lost much of its importance afterwards. In 324 BC, Alexander met Nearchus here, who explored the Persian Gulf as he returned from the Indus River by sea. In that same year Alexander celebrated in Susa with a mass wedding between the Persians and Macedonians.

The city retained its importance under the Seleucids for approximately one century after Alexander, however Susa lost its position of imperial capital to Seleucia on the Tigris to become the regional capital of the satrapy of Susiana. Nevertheless, Susa retained its economic importance to the empire with its vast assortment of merchants conducting trade in Susa, using Charax Spasinou as its port.

The city was named Seleucia on the Eulaeus or Seleucia ad Eulaeum.

Seleucus I Nicator minted coins there in substantial quantities. Susa is rich in Greek inscriptions, perhaps indicating a significant number of Greeks living in the city. Especially in the royal city large, well-equipped peristyle houses have been excavated.

=== Parthian period ===
Around 147 BC Susa and the adjacent Elymais broke free from the Seleucid Empire. The city was at least temporarily ruled by the rulers of the Elymais with Kamnaskires II Nikephoros minting coins there. The city may again have briefly returned to Seleucid rule, but starting with Phraates II (about 138–127 BC) to Gotarzes II (about 40–51 AD) almost all rulers of the Parthian Empire coined coins in the city, indicating that it was firmly in the hands of the Parthians at least during this period. The city however retained a considerable amount of independence and retained its Greek city-state organization well into the ensuing Parthian period. From second half of the first century it was probably partly governed by rulers of Elymais again, but it became Parthian once again in 215.

Susa was a frequent place of refuge for Parthian and later, the Persian Sassanid kings, as the Romans sacked Ctesiphon five different times between 116 and 297 AD. Susa was briefly captured in 116 AD by the Roman emperor Trajan during the course of his Parthian campaign. Never again would the Roman Empire advance so far to the east.

=== Sassanid period ===
Susa was conquered and destroyed in 224 AD by the Sassanid Ardashir I, but rebuilt immediately thereafter, and perhaps even temporarily a royal residence. According to a later tradition, Shapur I is said to have spent his twilight years in the city, although this tradition is uncertain and perhaps refers more to Shapur II.

Under the Sassanids, following the founding of Gundeshapur Susa slowly lost its importance. Archaeologically, the Sassanid city is less dense compared to the Parthian period, but there were still significant buildings, with the settlement extending over 400 hectares. Susa was also still very significant economically and a trading center, especially in gold trading. Coins also continued to be minted in the city. The city had a Christian community in a separate district with a Nestorian bishop, whose last representative is attested to in 1265. Archaeologically a stucco panel with the image of a Christian saint has been found.

During the reign of Shapur II after Christianity became the state religion of the Roman Empire in 312, and the identification of Christians as possible collaborators with the enemy Christians living in the Sasanian Empire were persecuted from 339 onwards. Shapur II also imposed a double tax on the Christians during his war campaign against the Romans. Following a rebellion of Christians living in Susa, the king destroyed the city in 339 using 300 elephants. He later had the city rebuilt and resettled with prisoners of war and weavers, which is believed to have been after his victory over the Romans in Amida in 359. The weaver produced silk brocade. He renamed it Eran-Khwarrah-Shapur ("Iran's glory [built by] Shapur").

=== Islamic period ===
During the Muslim conquest of Persia an Arab army invaded Khuzistan under the command of Abu Musa al-Ash'ari. After taking most of the smaller fortified towns the army captured Tustar in 642 before proceeding to besiege Susa. A place of military importance, it also held the tomb of the Jewish prophet Daniel. Two stories are given in the Muslim sources of how the city fell. In the first, a Persian priest proclaimed from the walls that only a dajjal was fated to capture the city. A dajjal is an Islamic term for an Al-Masih ad-Dajjal, a false messiah, compatible to the Antichrist in Christianity. In everyday use, it also means "deceiver" or "imposter". Siyah, a Persian general who had defected to Muslim side, claimed that by converting to Islam he had turned his back on Zoroastrianism and was thus a dajjal. Abu Musa agreed to Siyah's plan. Soon after as the sun came up one morning, the sentries on the walls saw a man in a Persian officer's uniform covered in blood lying on the ground before the main gate. Thinking it he had been left out overnight after a conflict the previous day, they opened the gate and some came out to collect him. As they approached, Siyah jumped up and killed them. Before the other sentries had time to react, Siyah and a small group of Muslim soldiers hidden nearby charged through the open gate. They held the gate open long enough for Muslim reinforcements to arrive and passing through the gate to take the city.

In the other story, once again the Muslims were taunted from the city wall that only an Al-Masih ad-Dajjal could capture the city, and since there were none in the besieging army then they may as well give up and go home. One of the Muslim commanders was so angry and frustrated at this taunt that he went up to one of the city gates and kicked it. Instantly the chains snapped, the locks broke and it fell open.

Following their entry into the city, the Muslims killed all of the Persian nobles.

Once the city was taken, as Daniel (Arabic: دانيال, romanized: Danyal) was not mentioned in the Qur'an, the initial reaction of the Muslim was to destroy the cult by confiscating the treasure that had stored at the tomb since the time of the Achaemenids. They then broke open the silver coffin and carried off the mummified corpse, removing from the corpse a signet ring, which carried an image of a man between two lions. However, upon hearing what had happened, the caliph Umar ordered the ring to be returned and the body reburied under the riverbed. In time, Daniel became a Muslim cult figure and they as well as Christians began making pilgrimages to the site, despite several other places claiming to be the site of Daniel's grave.

Following the capture of Susa, the Muslims moved on to besiege Gundeshapur.

Susa recovered following its capture and remained a regional center of more than 400 hectares in size. A mosque was built, but also Nestorian bishops are still testified, and a Jewish community with its own synagogue. The city continued to be a manufacturing center of luxury fabrics during this period. Archaeologically, the Islamic period is characterized mainly by its rich ceramics. Beth Huzaye (East Syrian Ecclesiastical Province) had a significant Christian population during the first millennium, and was a diocese of the Church of the East between the 5th and 13th centuries, in the metropolitan province of Beth Huzaye (Elam).

In 1218, the city was razed by invading Mongols and was never able to regain its previous importance. The city further degraded in the 15th century when the majority of its population moved to Dezful.

=== Today ===
Today the ancient center of Susa is unoccupied, with the population living in the adjacent modern Iranian town of Shush to the west and north of the historic ruins. Shush is the administrative capital of Shush County in Iran's Khuzestan province. It had a population of 64,960 in 2005.

== World Heritage listing ==
In July 2015, it was inscribed on the list of World Heritage Sites by UNESCO.

== Gallery ==
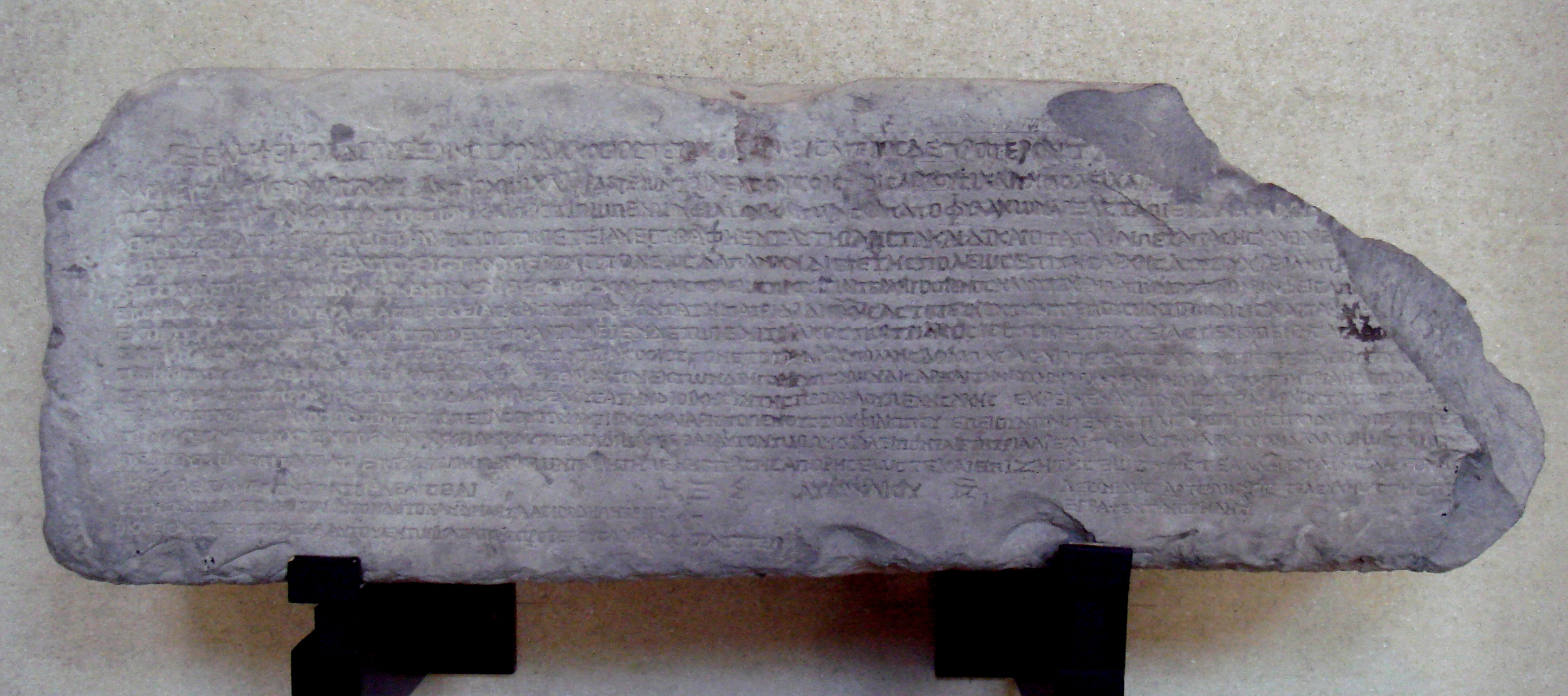
Letter in Greek of the Parthian king Artabanus II to the inhabitants of Susa in the 1st century AD (the city retained Greek institutions since the time of the Seleucid Empire). Louvre Museum.

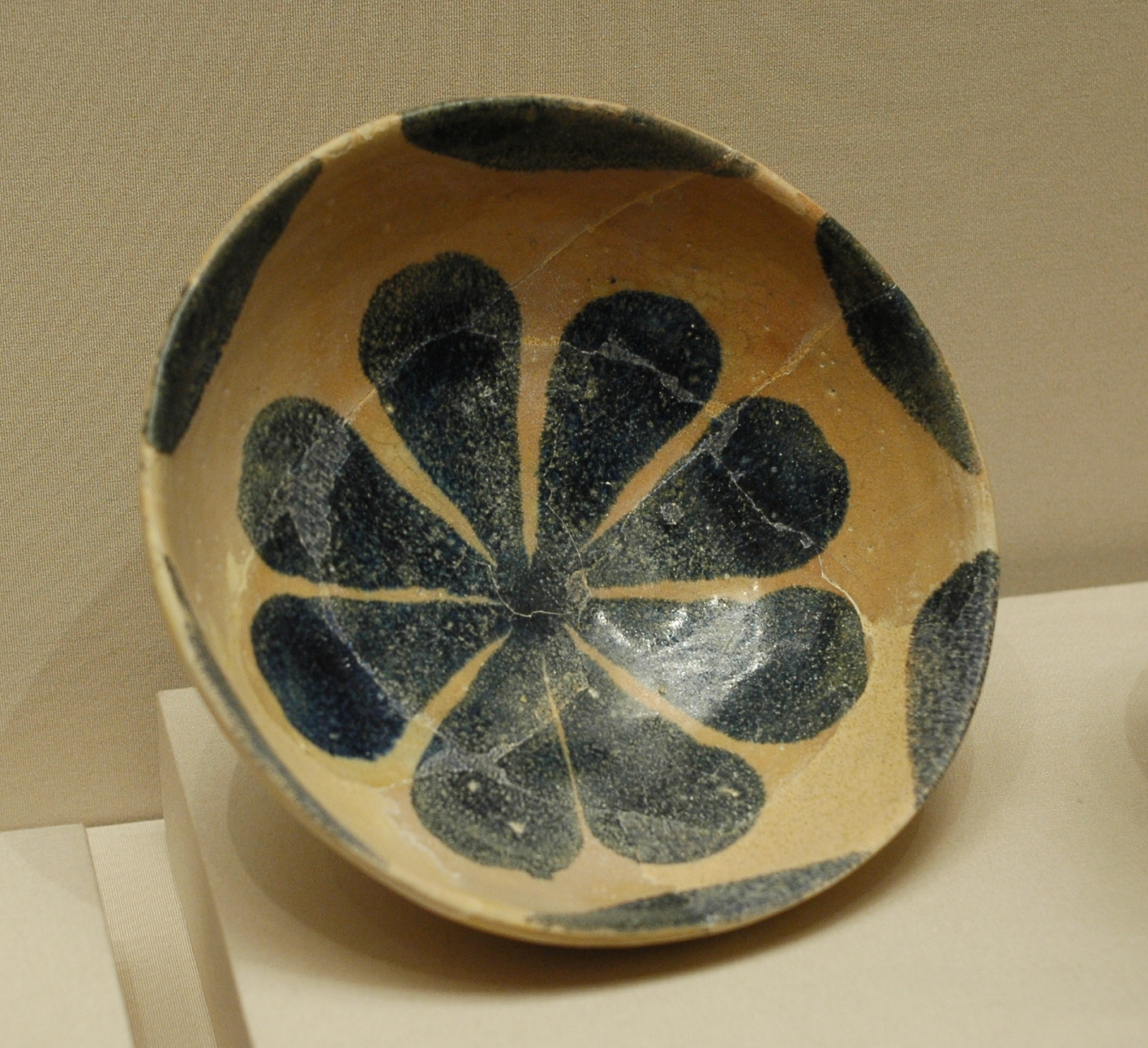
Glazed clay cup: Cup with rose petals, 8th–9th centuries

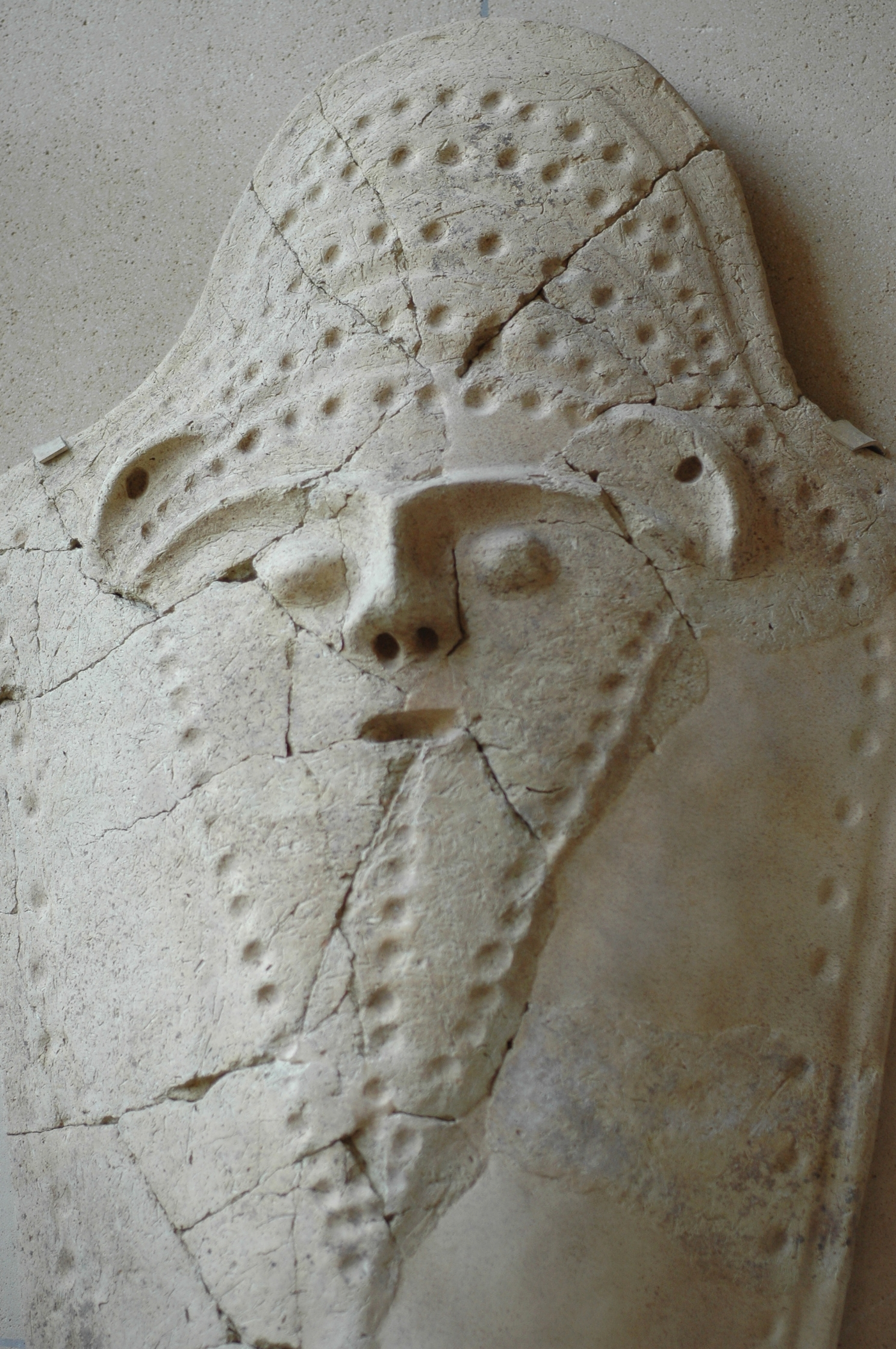
Anthropoid sarcophagus

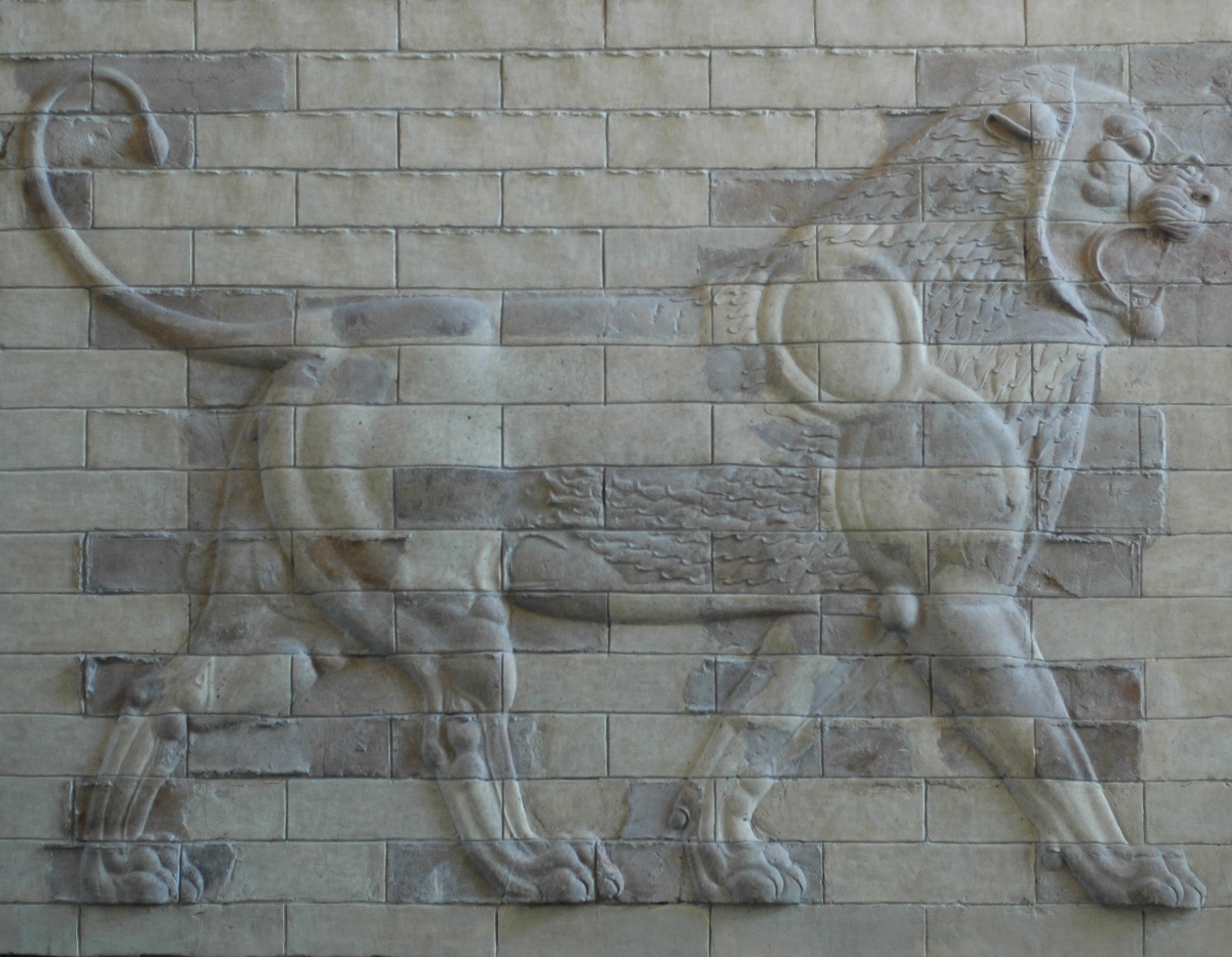
Lion on a decorative panel from Darius I the Great's palace

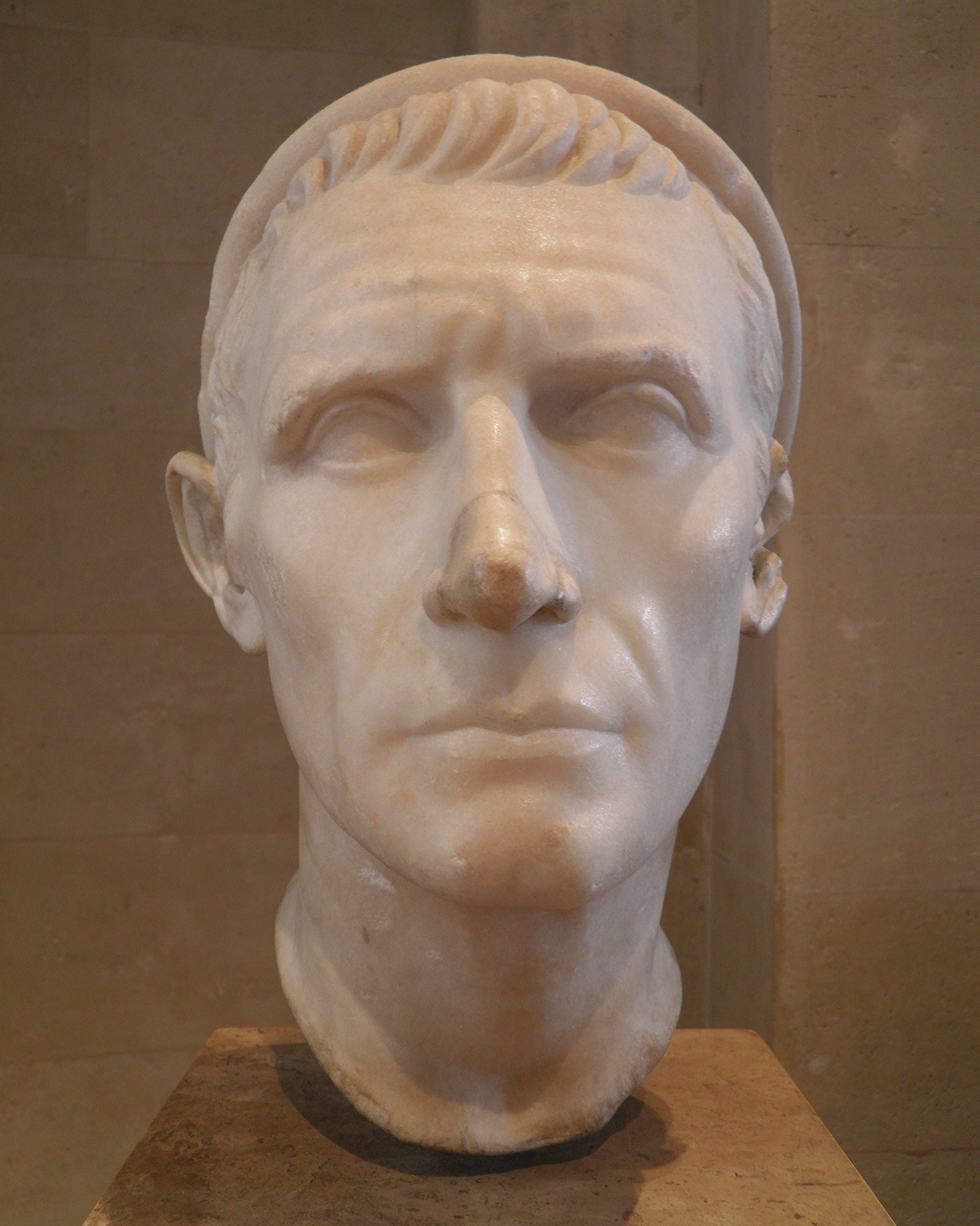
Marble head representing Seleucid King Antiochus III who was born near Susa around 242 BC.

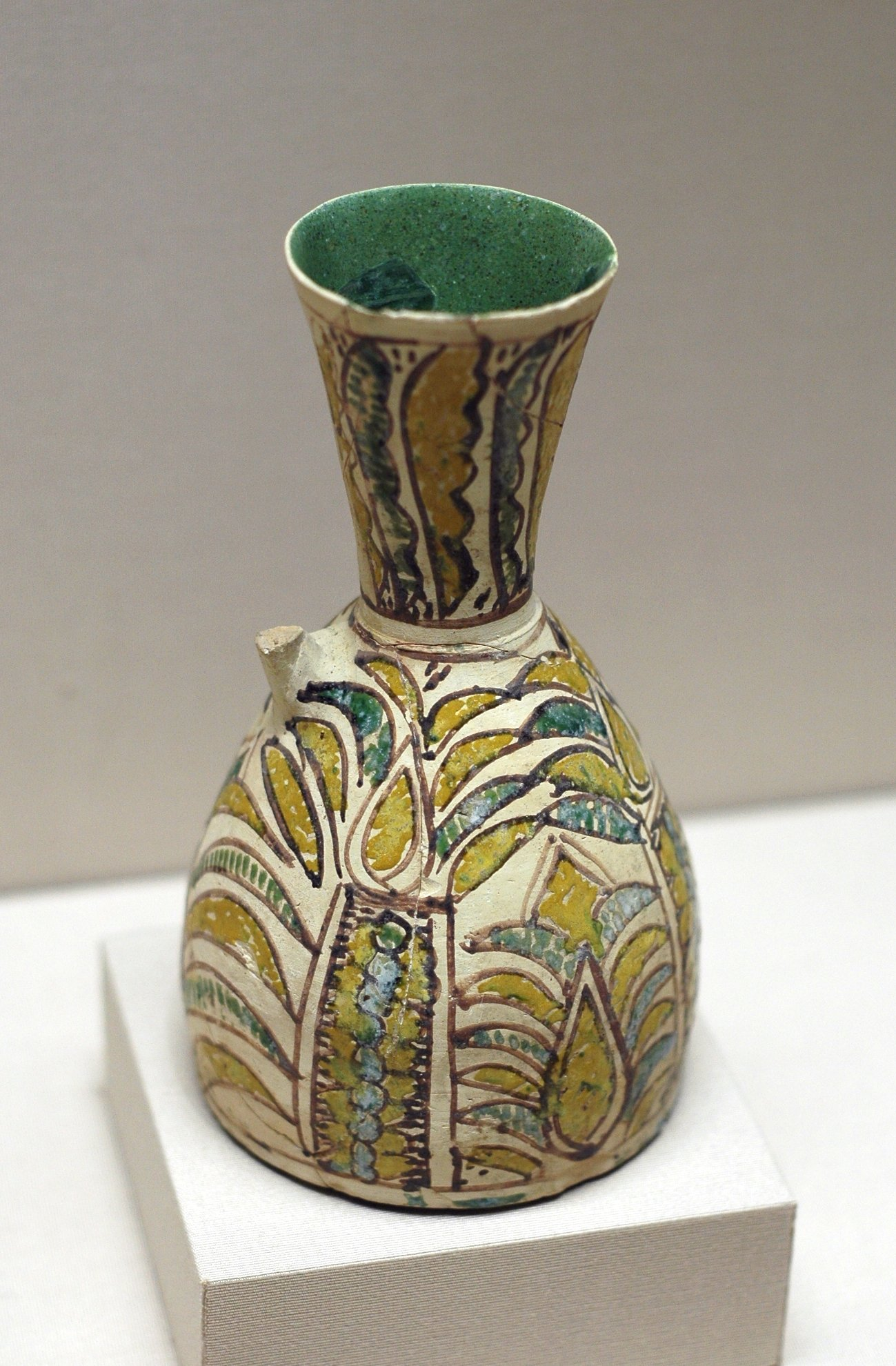
Glazed clay vase: Vase with palmtrees, 8th–9th centuries

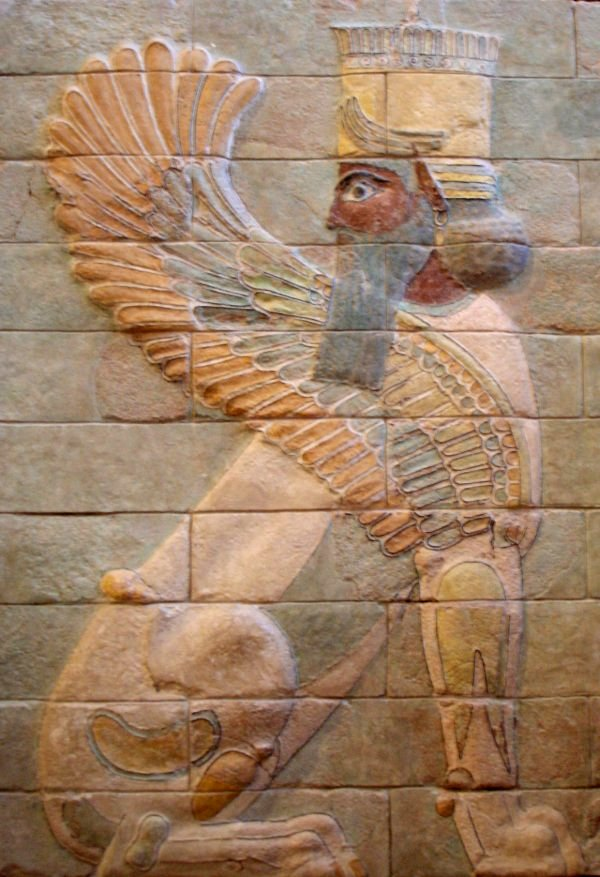
Winged sphinx from the palace of Darius the Great at Susa.

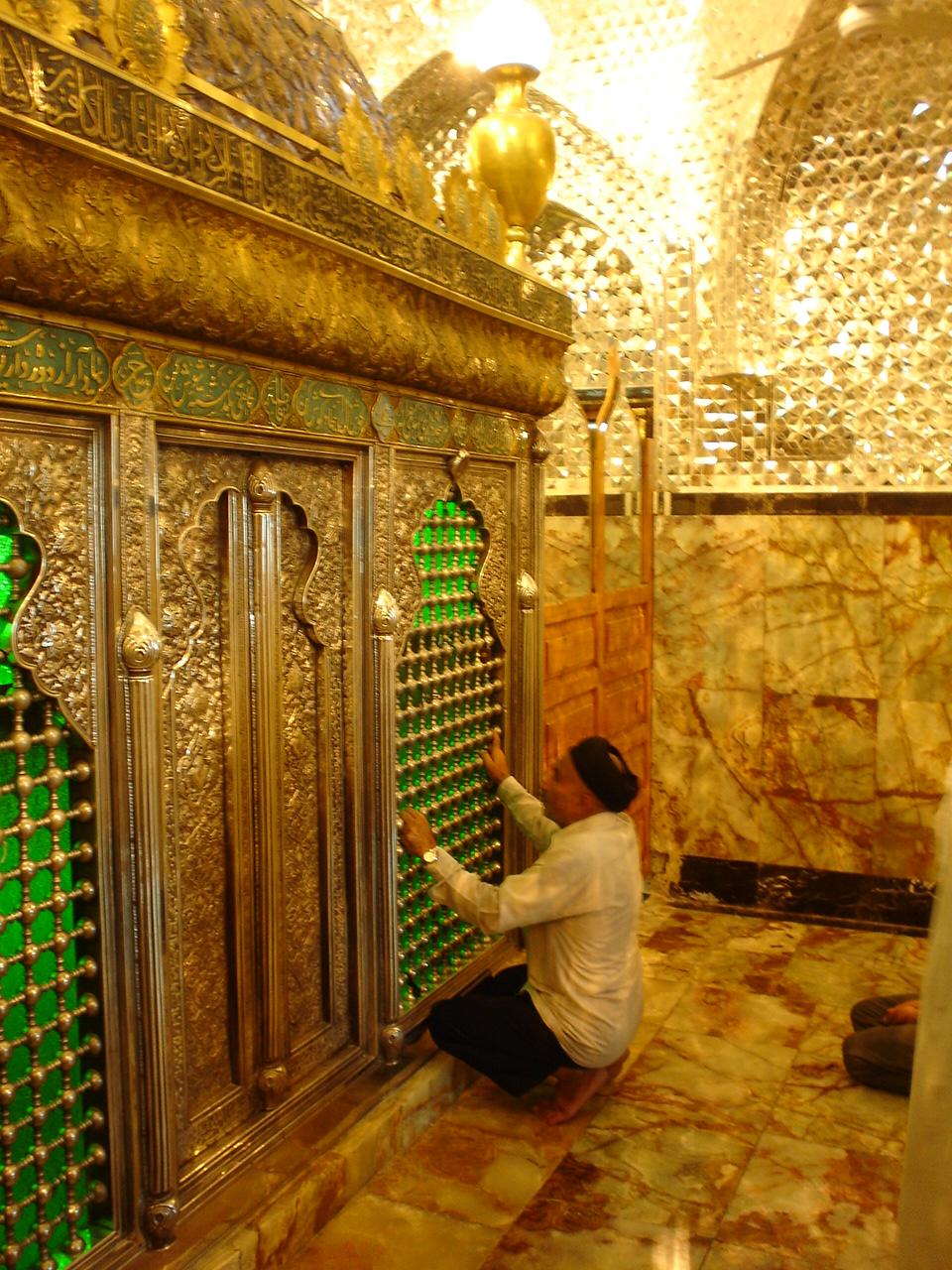
Tomb of Daniel

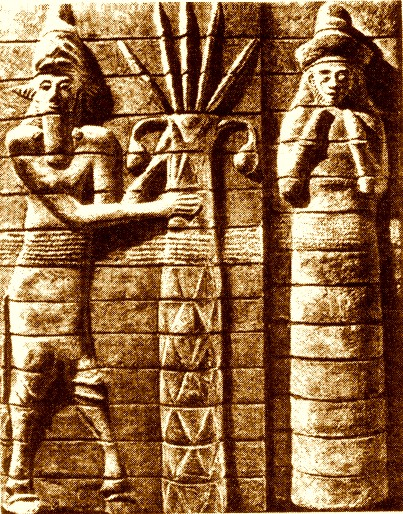
Ninhursag with the spirit of the forests next to the seven-spiked cosmic tree of life. Relief from Susa.

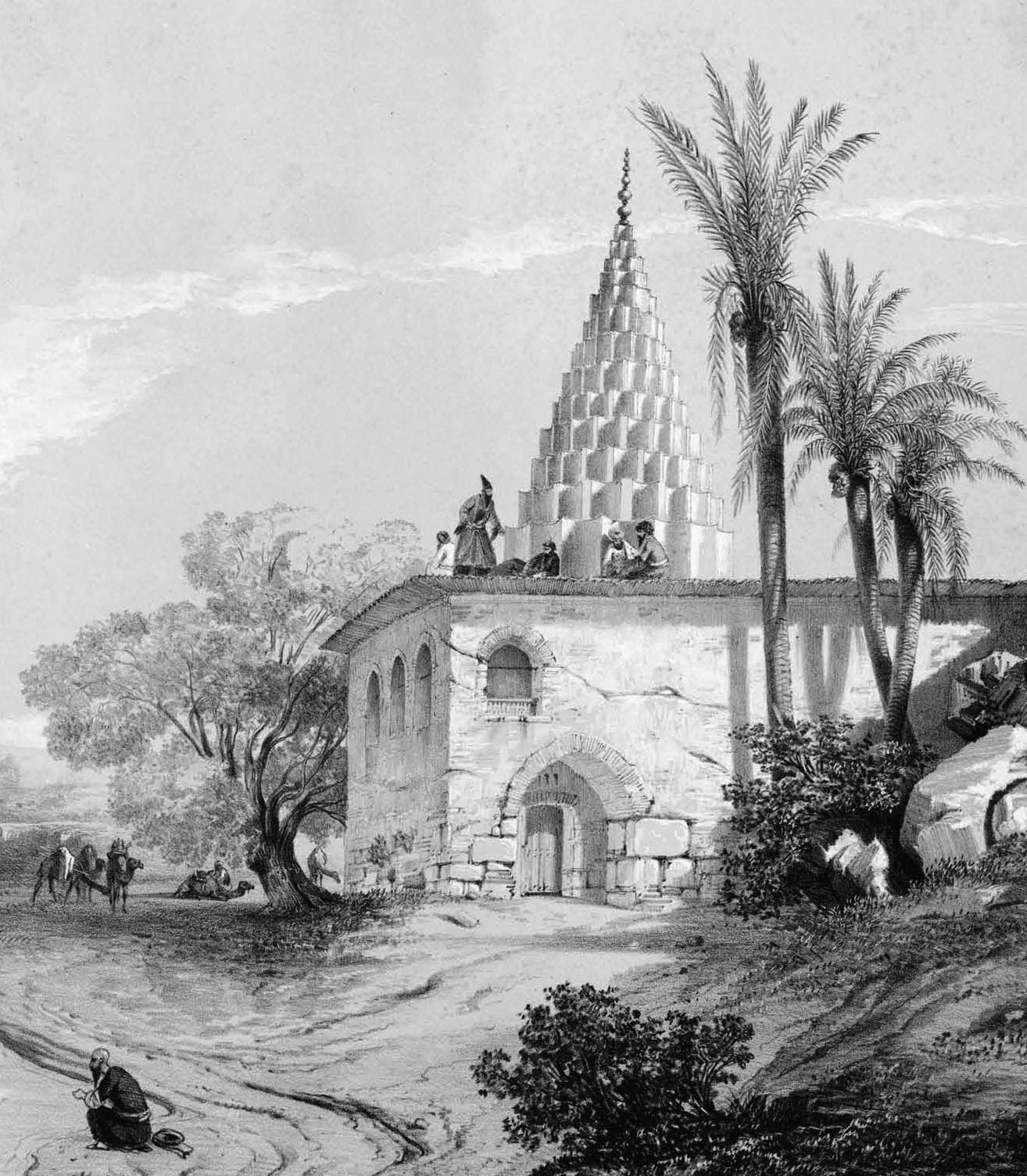
19th-century engraving of Daniel's tomb in Susa, from Voyage en Perse Moderne, by Flandin and Coste.

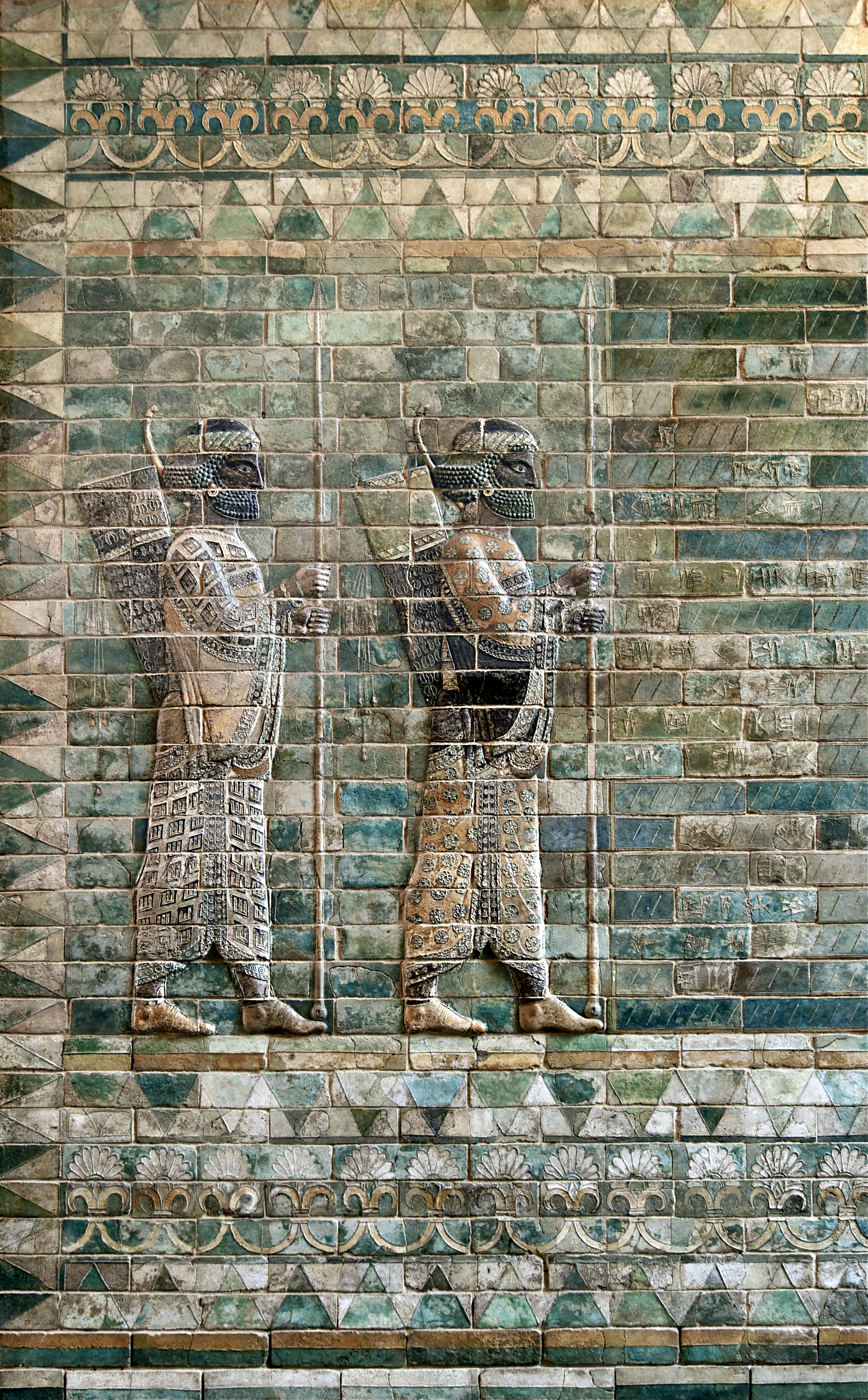
Archers frieze from Darius' palace at Susa. Detail of the beginning of the frieze, left. Louvre Museum

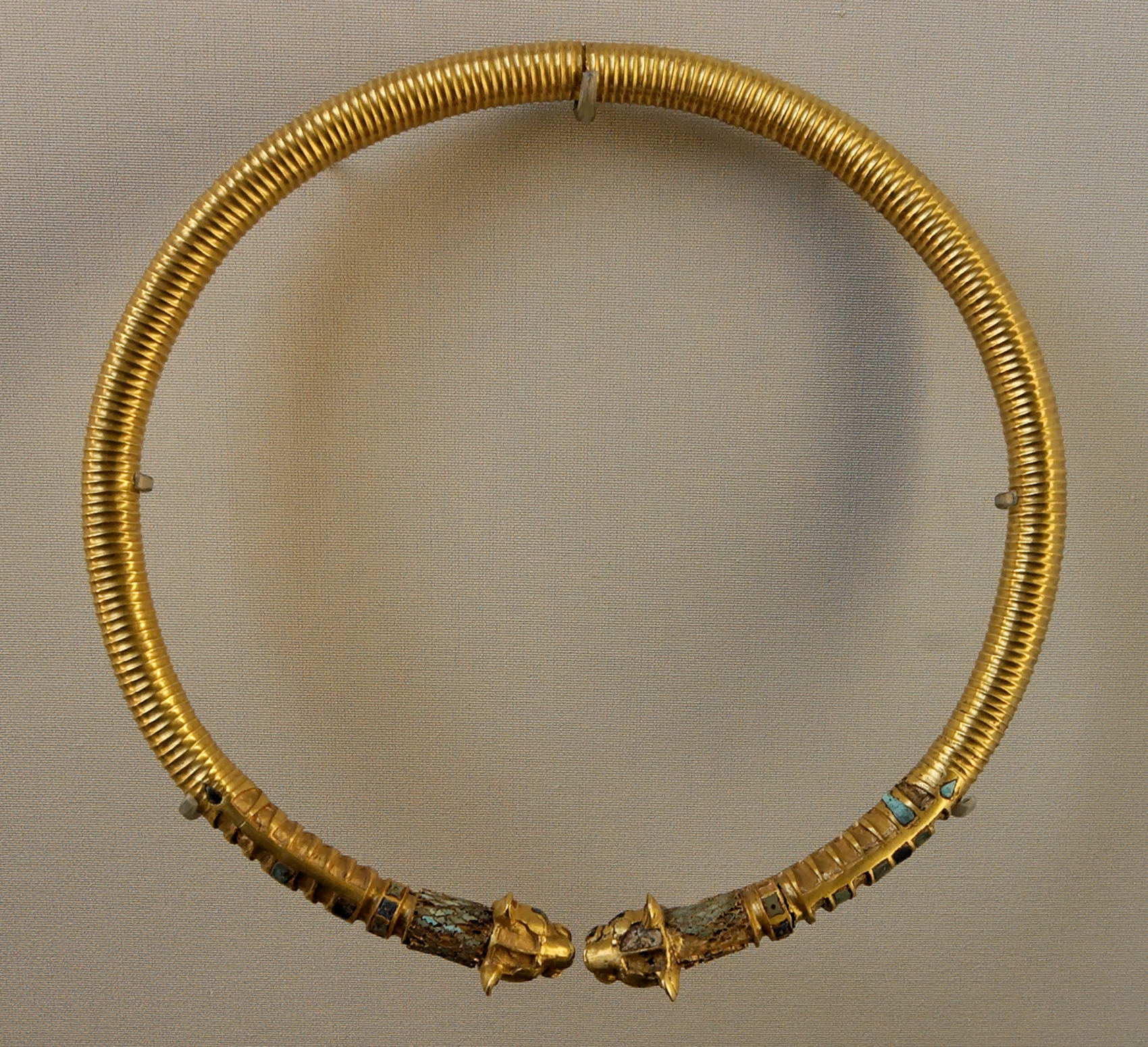
Ribbed torc with lion heads, Achaemenid artwork, excavated by Jacques de Morgan, 1901, found in the Acropole Tomb

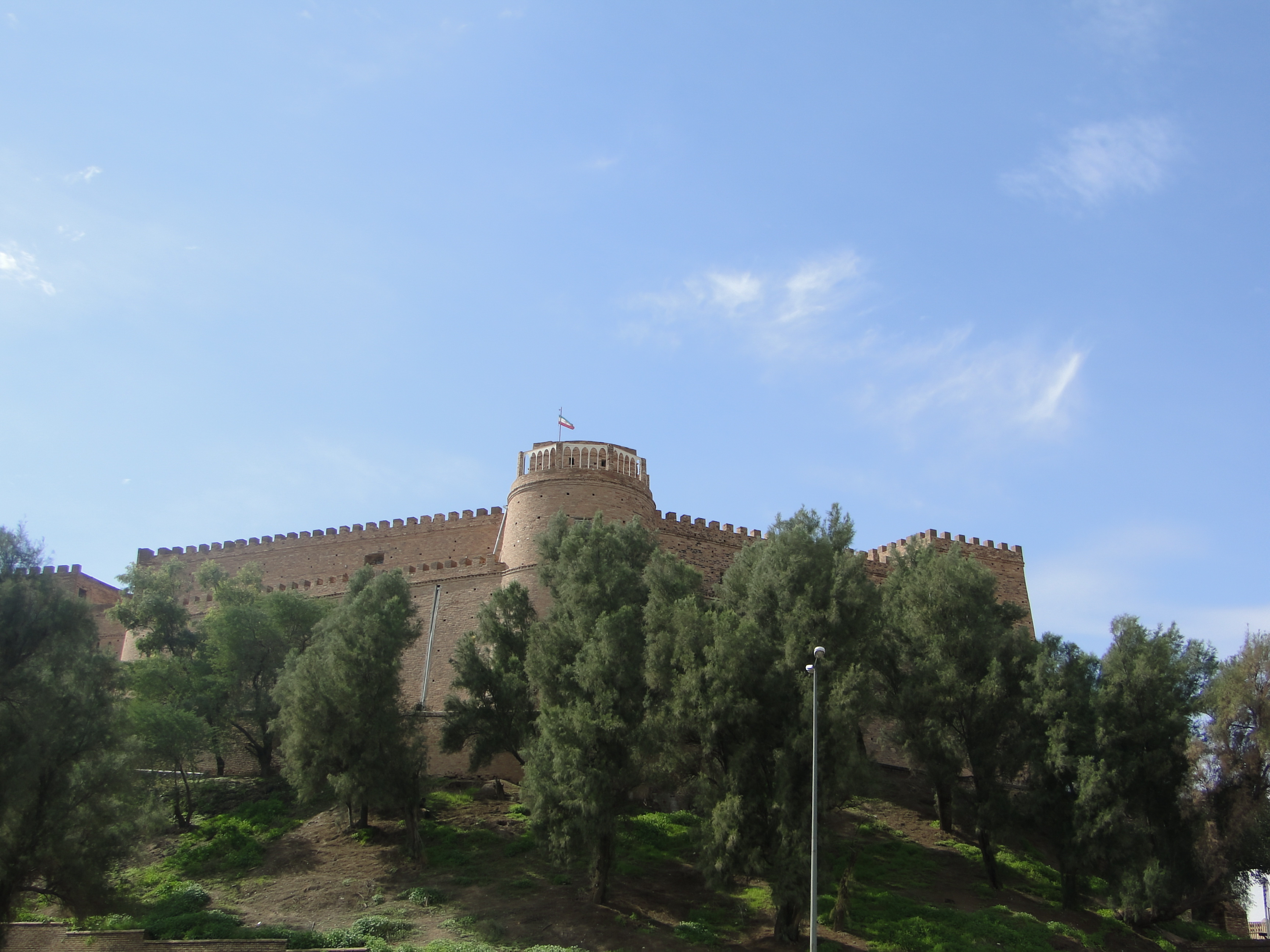
Shush Castle, 2011

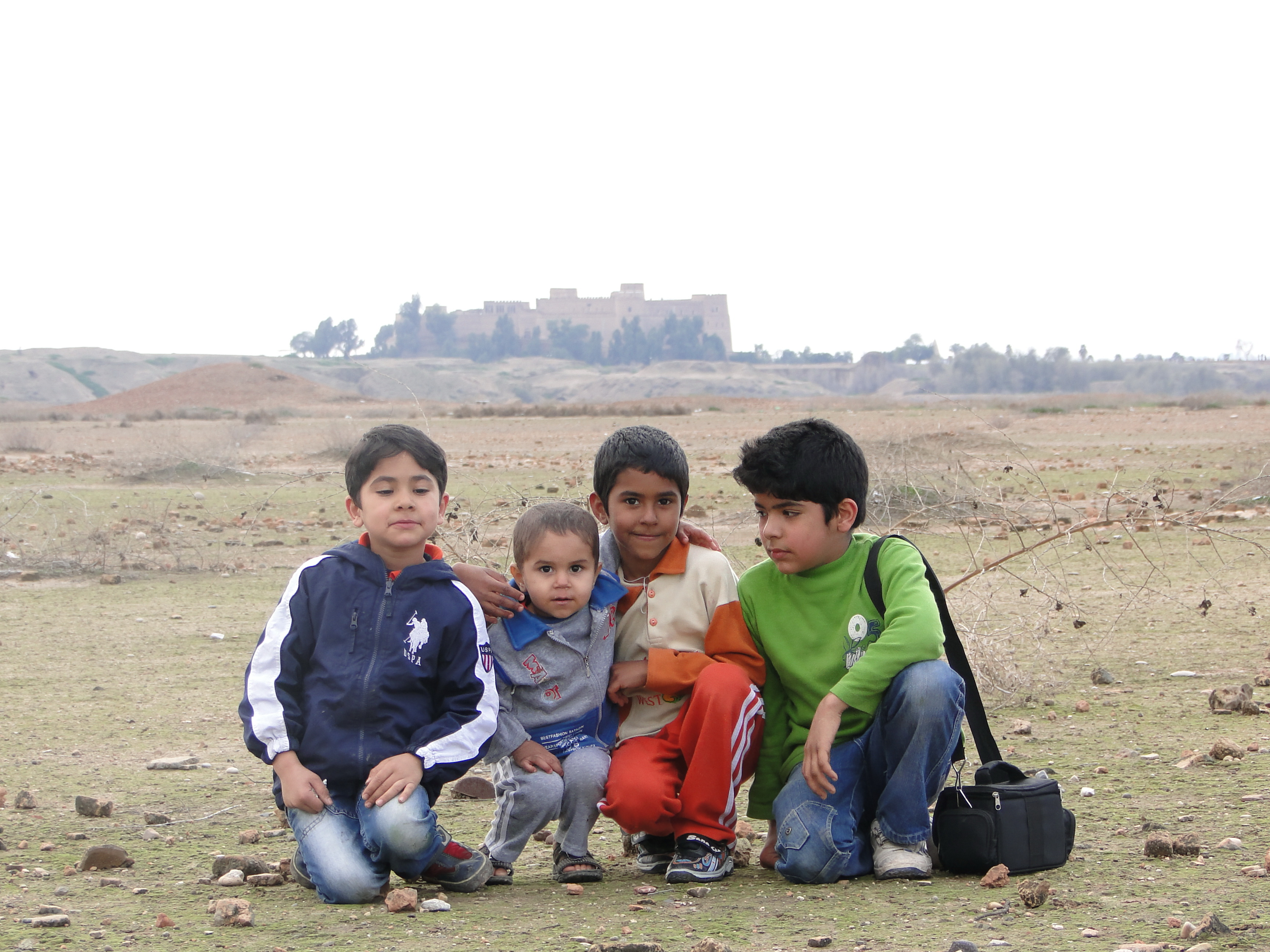
Children in Susa

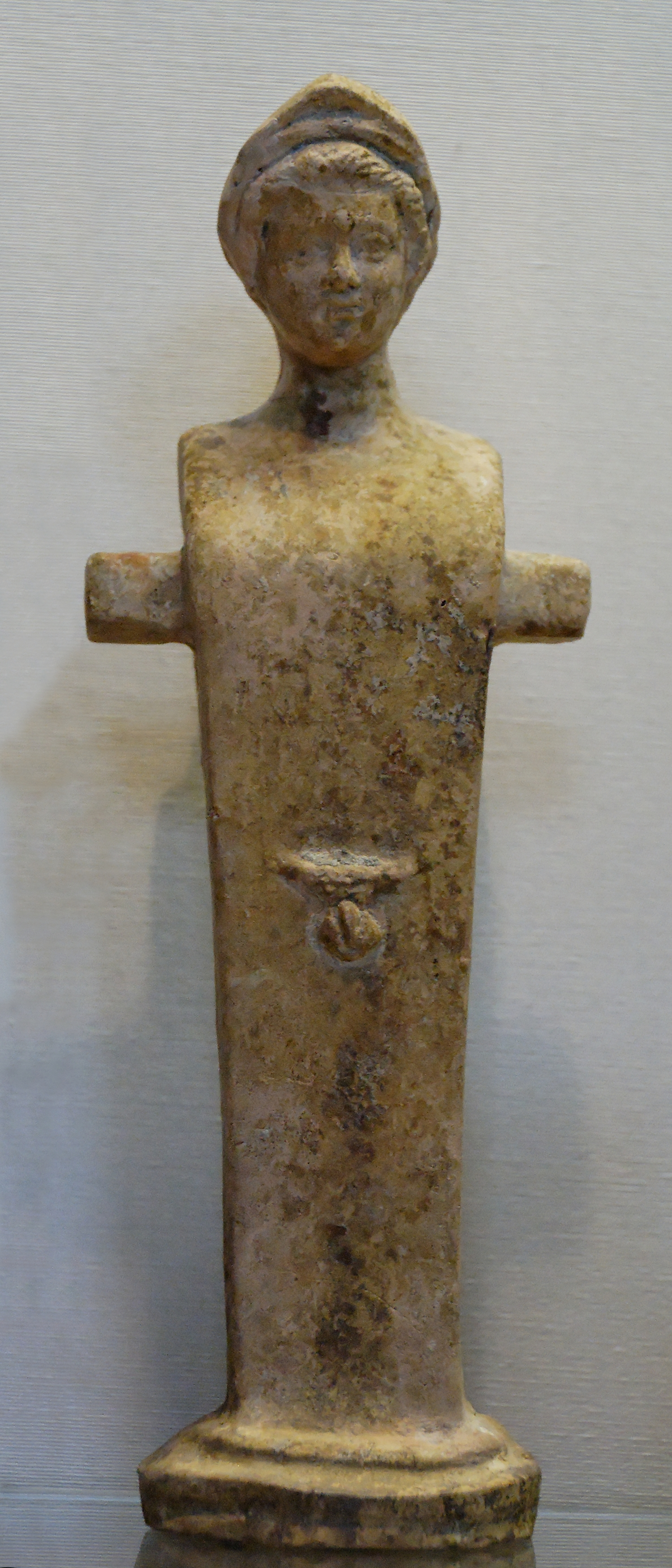
Herm pillar with Hermes, from the well of the "Dungeon" in Susa.

== See also ==
- Abulites
- Achaemenid architecture
- Choqa Zanbil
- Elam
- History of Iran
- Islamic ceramics of the Susa site
- List of cities of the ancient Near East
- List of oldest continuously inhabited cities
- Muslim conquest of Khuzestan
- Short chronology timeline
