= History of Khuzestan province =

Khuzestan province is located in southwestern Iran. Its history extends from the pre-Aryan ancient Elamite civilization to the modern-day Islamic Republic.

== Prehistory ==
Susiana plain, centered around Susa in the north of Khuzestan province, has been the subject of the longest and the most extensive archaeological research in Iran. Just to the northwest in Ilam province, there's also the Deh Luran plain, that was culturally very similar.

=== Susiana plain ===
Unlike southern Mesopotamia, early settled life in Susiana was dominated by a single site: Chogha Mish. It was abandoned around 4800 BCE, perhaps because of increased activity of nomadic pastoralist groups in the lowlands. For several centuries afterward there was a transitional phase during which Chogha Do Sar, 9 km to the southwest, was the largest settlement in the region. Susa was founded around 4400 BCE as a cluster of several hamlets that later merged to become a single larger town. It may have competed with Chogha Do Sar for a while before ultimately becoming the main settlement in the region.

=== Zohreh River plain ===
From 2015 to 2020 the Zohreh Prehistoric Project has been directed by Abbas Moghaddam. In the Zohreh River plain, they have discovered a very large site of Chega Sofla dating from 4,700 to 3,700 BC. It is located close to Sardasht, Khuzestan, in the proximity to Makran coast. These peoples used bricks in the construction of their tombs. Here we find the oldest example of using bricks in tomb construction so far found. These tombs are built with mud bricks and baked bricks, which is quite unusual for that time, as well as in stone.

Large quantities of luxurious pottery and a big variety of copper tools and other copper objects have been found. Many cultural similarities with Susa, in the lower Zagros Mountains, Iran, have been identified.

A discovery of 71 unusual conical-shaped stelae had been announced at Tall Chegah-e Sofla in 2020. These stelae are dating from the late fifth-millennium BC. The height of the stelae varies between 81 cm and 32.5 cm. Some of the stelae have no carvings, but most of them are carved with various figures, such as of humans, goats, and eyes. These carved eyes can be oval or circular. Many stelae also carry some simple geometrical designs. Originally they were set upright, but were found as all stacked together as a group.

Twenty samples of metal objects, whitish beads and rock fragments were discovered at Chega Sofla, and investigated by scientists. They identified the earliest man-made enstatite beads in Iran, as well as the silver objects that may be some of the world's most ancient. The copper-based artifacts found were also analyzed. Besides copper, they contained arsenic, antimony, nickel, as well as lead.

Authors determined that most of the raw materials at the site were imported from farther distances, such as from the central or northwest Iran.

== Elam ==
Khuzestan was once inhabited by a people known as the Elamites, who spoke neither Indo-European languages (like the Medes and Persians of the Iranian plateau) nor Semitic languages (like the peoples of the Mesopotamian city-states). The Elamite language was not related to any Iranian languages, but may have been part of a larger group known as Elamo-Dravidian. Archaeologists and historians have documented various Elamite dynasties ranging from approximately 2700 BCE to 644 BCE.

The boundaries of Elam shifted throughout history, but Elam usually included present-day Khuzestan and areas of the Iranian plateau now part of the Iranian province of Fars. Elamite kings sometimes ruled as far afield as Babylon; sometimes they were completely subjugated by the Babylonians and Assyrians, and vice versa, as was the case for numerous dynasties that ruled Iran.

The core region of Elam appears to have been the rugged mountainous area in the Zagros Mountains. The lowlands of Susiana in the west and the southeastern Zagros around Kerman province, with sites such as Tepe Sialk, Tepe Yahya, Tal-i-Iblis, and Shahdad, were more on the periphery. In the eastern region, there was also an indigenous population. The main economy of Elam was based on agriculture and nomadic pastoralism, while trade with lowland Mesopotamia (especially in metals, timber, and precious stones) also played a role from the 4th millennium BCE onwards.

During the Proto-Elamite period, Susa was the lone major settlement in Susiana. In the following Old Elamite period, during the late 3rd millennium BCE, Tepe Musian (14 hectares) on the Deh Loran plain was the only other large town in Khuzestan. Then, early in the 2nd millennium BCE, Susa expanded to a size of 85 hectares and became a major political, commercial, and cultural city. Houses were built of mud brick and arranged around courtyards, and in many cases the dead were buried in tombs underneath the courtyard or the floors. Tombs like these continued to be made in Susan houses until the middle of the 1st millennium BCE. At the same time, towns and villages appeared in the lowlands as well as in the valleys in the neighboring highlands. This, combined with texts from Susa, suggests that there was a high level of agricultural development in the region then, with canals for irrigation.

During the Middle Elamite period, the Elamite kings successfully invaded Mesopotamia, and the increased use of the Elamite language in documents and inscriptions along with new artistic and architectural forms indicates their power at this time. Finds at the major sites in Khuzestan from this period attest to royal sponsorship of metalworking and other technologies. There was a growing interregional trade to accommodate the demand for luxury objects at royal courts and religious sanctuaries. Increased populations in major cities may indicate a contraction in settled agriculture, with pastoralism, trade, and plunder playing a more important role in the economy.

The main archaeological site from the first part of this period is Haft Tepe, 25 km southeast of Susa. Known as Kabnak, this site includes a funerary temple complex with vaulted underground tombs and two mud-brick terraces that may represent the eroded bases of ziggurats. A fragmentary stele indicates that the complex was maintained by the 16th-century BCE king Tepti-ahar. Adjoining the larger terrace was a workshop area including a double-chambered kiln. This area made objects from metal, bone, shell, and mosaic. Ceramics were also made here, including painted clay funerary heads which first appear here and then continue to appear throughout the period.

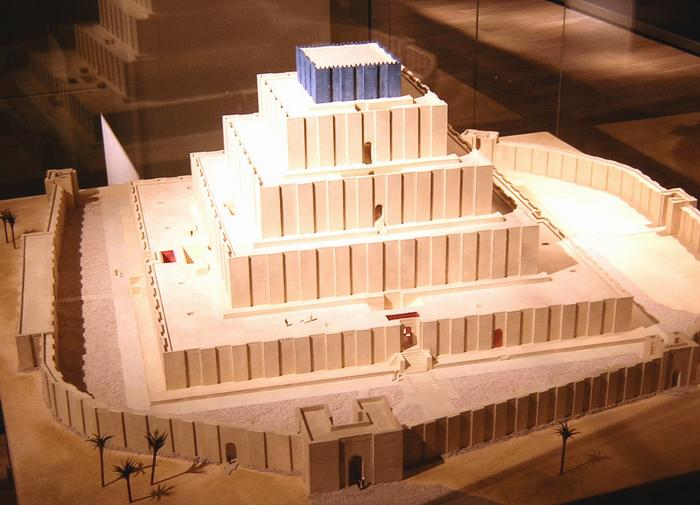
A reconstruction of the ziggurat at Chogha Zanbil

The main site during the second part of the Middle Elamite period is Chogha Zanbil, which was anciently known as Āl Untaš Napiriša or Dūr Untaš. It had a ziggurat and several surrounding temples, which may have been used as a sanctuary for deities throughout the realm. There was also a royal quarter with three monumental palaces, each with large courts surrounded by long halls and storerooms. The site of Chogha Zanbil may not have been extensively inhabited.

Terracotta figurines are characteristic of Elamite art during the late 2nd millennium BCE, suggesting a possible continuity of religious beliefs during this time. Sculptures of beds and nude women supporting their breasts with their hands are common during this period but do not appear to have remained common after around 1000 BCE. Sculptures of hump-backed bulls are also found at several sites, including Susa, Haft Tepe, and Chogha Zanbil. Rock-cut sanctuaries in the highlands, such as Kūl-e Fara and Šekāfta Salmān near Izeh in eastern Khuzestan, also suggest continuity of religious beliefs. Both sanctuaries have later inscriptions indicating that the area was ruled by a king named Hanni, who ruled over a state named Aapir.

Susa went into a rapid decline at the end of the 2nd millennium BCE. Famines appear to have had "disastrous effects" on the surrounding rural population at that time. Elamite groups may have been pushed to the valleys of eastern Khuzestan from the west by new ethnic groups (or already-present ones that had previously been subordinate). Eastern Khuzestan appears to have increased in both importance and population during this period. The only excavated site in this area is Tall-i Ghazir near Ramhormoz, surrounded by the Bakhtiari mountains.

Around the late 8th century BCE, Susa appears to have recovered and enjoyed a period of renewed prosperity. By this time, at least two other cities, Madaktu and Khidalu, had come to play important political roles.

Historians differ as to whether the Elamites could be considered "Iranian". On the one hand, the Elamites spoke a non-Iranian language and were culturally closer to the established civilizations of Sumer and Akkad than they were to the tribes of the Iranian plateau. On the other hand, the Elamites linked the old civilizations of Mesopotamia and the new peoples of the plateau, and their version of Mesopotamian civilization was a formative influence on the first indisputably Persian empire of the Achaemenids. Elam was one of the first conquests of the new Persian empire; Elamite scribes kept the Persians' records, writing them down in Elamite cuneiform. Hence one contemporary historian, Elton Daniel, states that the Elamites are "the founders of the first Iranian empire in the geographic sense". (The History of Iran, 2001, p. 26). If the Elamites are considered proto-Persians, then Khuzestan would have been one of the cradles of Persian civilization. Many experts such as Sir Percy Sykes in fact called the Elamites "the earliest civilization of Persia" (A History of Persia, p38), and Ibn Nadeem in his book al-Fehrest ("الفهرست"), mentions that all the Median and Persian lands of antiquity spoke one language. In his book, which is the most accredited account of spoken languages of Iran during the early Islamic era, Ibn Nadeem quotes the 8th century scholar Abdullah Ibn al-Muqaffa as having counted Khuzi among the Iranian languages and for having identified it as the unofficial language of the royalty of Iran.

In 644 BCE, the Assyrian king Ashurbanipal conquered Elam and destroyed their capital at Susa. For a time, the area was ruled from northern Mesopotamia. The area then seems to have re-established its independence. It was known as Susiana and ruled from Susa. It managed to remain independent of the burgeoning Median Empire.

== The Achaemenid Empire ==
- In 538 BCE Cyrus the Great conquers the Median Empire, then Susiana, then Assyria. The city of Susa is rebuilt as an Achaemenid capital.

Over the succeeding two centuries, Persian civilization established itself in Khuzestan, though the Elamite language is said to have survived for another thousand years, until the 5th century CE.

== Alexander and the Seleucids ==
Main articles: Alexander of Macedon, Seleucid Empire

- In 331 BCE, Alexander of Macedon defeats the Achaemenids at the Battle of Gaugamela and establishes the largest empire yet known. Alexander dies young and his empire is split between his successors.
- From 305 BCE to 60 BCE, the Hellenistic Seleucid dynasty, rules from Seleucia on the Tigris. They repeatedly clash with the Parthian empire and eventually fall to the Parthians, in 129 BCE.

== The Parthians ==
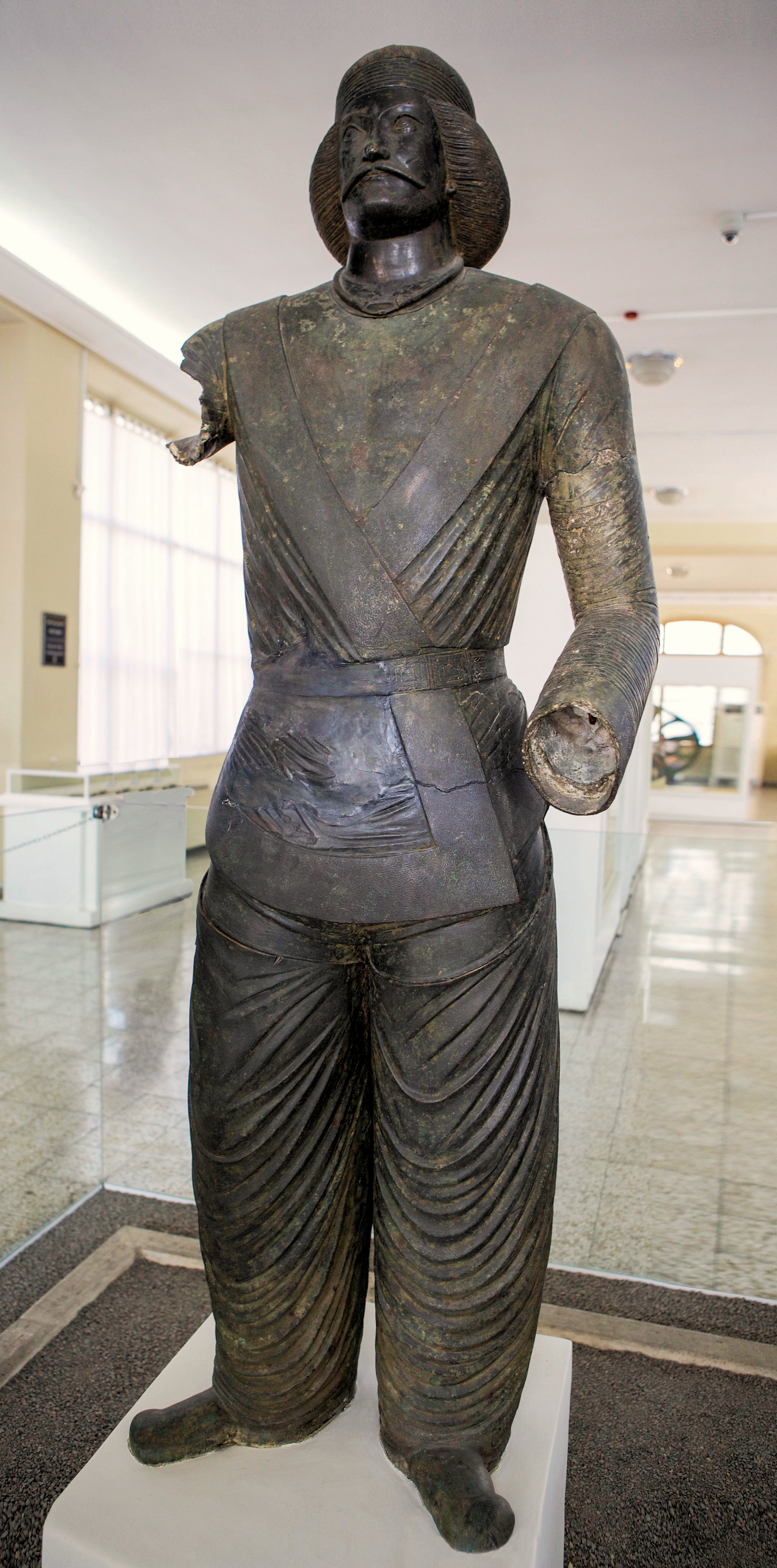
The Shami statue, found north of Izeh in 1935, dates from the Parthian era, most likely the 1st century CE.

- 300 BCE to 224 CE, The Parthian empire conquers much of present-day Iran and contests Mesopotamia and Khuzestan with the Seleucids and then the Roman Empire.

== The Sassanids ==
- 224 to 621 CE, The area was subject to Sassanid dynasty. The area is known as Xuzestan during this period.

During the early years of the reign of Shapur II (309–379), Arabs crossed the Persian Gulf from Bahrain to "Ardashir-Khora" of Fars and raided the interior. In retaliation, Shapur II led an expedition through Bahrain, defeated the combined forces of the Arab tribes of Taghleb, Bakr bin Wael, and Abd Al-Qays and advanced temporarily into Yamama in central Najd. The Sassanids resettled these tribes in Kerman and Ahvaz. Arabs named Shapur II, as Shabur Dhul-aktāf (he who owns shoulders because either he pierced or dislocated captured Arabs shoulders or he had wide shoulders) after this battle. (p. 202, Encyclopædia Iranica).

It should be pointed out that the Arab presence in Iran, did not begin with the Arab conquest of the Sassanid Empire. Mutual infiltration into and out of Iran, began before the Muslim conquests and continued as a result of joint exertions of the civilized Arabs (ahl al-madar) as well as the desert Arabs (ahl al-wabar). There were tribesmen of Bakr bin Wael and Tamim(Thamim) in Khuzestan and Fars prior to the arrival of the Arab Muslim Armies. Some of these Arab groups were sedentary while others were nomadic. Some fought on behalf of the Sassanid Empire (Taghleb, Eyad), while others (Lakhmid, Shayban, Bakr bin Wael) began struggling against the Sassanids. These latter group had already won a celebrated, if limited, victory at Du Qar around 604 CE

Some local Arabs led by Al-Motanna bin Hareta Al-Shaybani helped to direct the attention of the nascent Muslim state toward Iran by converting to Islam and negotiating with Medina for support in their anti-Sassanid moves. (p. 210-211 Encyclopædia Iranica ).

== Early Muslim dynasties ==
- 630 CE The Arabs, united by their new faith of Islam, expand into Mesopotamia and a few years later into Khuzestan.

For several centuries, Khuzestan was part of the province of Mesopotamia and ruled by distant caliphs. Over time, most of the inhabitants adopted Islam. The Persian language absorbed thousands of Arabic loanwords and some Arabic syntax. The Persians in their turn had a deep influence on their Arab conquerors.

Khuzestan was a rich part of a thriving empire. The Karun river was dammed, and sugar-cane plantations spread over reclaimed scrublands or marshlands. Many noted Muslim scholars, scientists, artists, poets, and musicians were Khuzestanis.

- 661 – Umayyad caliphs rule from Damascus.
- 750 – Abbasid caliphs rule from Baghdad or Samarra.
- 946 – 1258 The Abbasid caliphs become mere figureheads. Various Buwayhid and Seljuk Turk chieftains rule in the caliph's name, or compete to do so.

The political situation was extremely fluid and the boundaries of the various emirates and sultanates tended to disappear quickly.

In the Umayyad period, large tribes of nomads from the Hanifa, Tamim, and Abd al-Qays tribes crossed the Persian Gulf and occupied some of the richest Basran territories around Ahvaz and in Fars during the second Islamic civil war in 661-665/680-684 (Encyclopædia Iranica, p. 215, under Arab Tribes of Iran).

During the Abbasid period, in the second half of the 10th century, the Assad tribe, taking advantage of quarrels under the Buwayhids, penetrated into Khuzestan, where the Tamim tribe had been inhabiting since pre-Islamic times. However, following the fall of the Abbasid dynasty, the flow of Arab immigrants into Persia gradually diminished, but it nonetheless continued.

After the decline of the Saffarid dynasty in the late 9th century, Baghdad maintained a strong centralized control of Khuzestan until the local Baridi dynasty became relatively independent around 927. The Buyids reasserted control from Baghdad on and off from 941 until the Seljuqs gained power in 1055.

During the medieval period, one of the main economic activities in Khuzestan was the manufacturing of luxury textiles: silks, brocades, silk-wool blends, and tiraz fabric. The tiraz factories were a state monopoly and thus controlling them held political significance. This is a continuation of the earlier Sassanid trend where luxury goods were produced in imperial workshops; the Sassanids had developed a silk industry in Khuzestan, setting up workshops in Tustar, Jundi-Sabur, and Susa. During the Middle Ages, Tustar in particular seems to have consistently been one of the most important textile producers in the region, as it is today. Its economic importance is indicated by the fact that it was allowed to produce the Kiswah (the embroidered covering for the Kaaba) in 321 AH/933 CE – an act with enormous political importance.

Almost all the cloth-producing cities of medieval Khuzestan were located on rivers. These rivers provided a source of irrigation for the cotton, flax, and mulberry crops used in the production of textiles, and they were also used to power water mills for processing the raw materials. They also functioned as a means of transportation and supported commerce as well.

Khuzestan was also noted as a producer of sugar during this period. Contemporary accounts indicate the presence of two places with sugar refineries: Sus and Jundisabur. Al-Maqdisi wrote that Jundisabur "provided all the sugar consumed in Khorasan and Jibal", indicating that it was very important economically. Cultivation of date palms was also very widespread in Khuzestan; especially in the southern regions that are saltier and less irrigated.

Despite being a political capital of the region, Ahvaz was not a major producer of either food products or manufactured goods. Its primary function then, as now, was mostly administration and redistribution.

== The Mongol invasion ==
From 1219 to 1335, Mongols under Genghis Khan and then his grandson Hulegu invaded from the steppes to the east of the Iranian plateau, reaching Palestine before they were stopped. Baghdad, the rich and fabled capital of the Abbasid caliphs, fell in 1258. The Middle Eastern Mongol Ilkhanate sustained itself for a century and then disintegrated. Much of Khuzestan was destroyed and left in ruins.

== Safavid era ==
In 1393 Khuzestan was conquered by Tamerlane and afterwards seems to have been ruled by his successors, the Timurids. As the Timurid rule decayed, Khuzestan was taken over by the Msha'sha'iya, a Shi'a millenarian sect who dominated the western region of the province from the middle of the 15th century to the 19th century. According to most sources, their descendants were still to be found in the 19th century, as powerful local rulers in the city of Hoveizeh, their original center.

In 1510 Khuzestan was conquered by the Safavid dynasty. The western part of Khuzestan was called Arabistan from this point on, due to the increasing Arab population. The eastern part of Khuzestan was known as Khuzestan and was mostly inhabited by Lurs people thus sometimes incorporated into Greater Lur. It was often contested between the Safavids and the Ottoman Empire, which held the neighboring town of Basra on the other side of the Shatt al-Arab river in modern-day Iraq.

In the latter part of the 16th century, the Bani Kaab, from Kuwait, settled in Khuzestan. (see J.R. Perry, "The Banu Ka'b: An Amphibious Brigand State in Khuzestan", Le Monde Iranien et L'Islam I, 1971, p133) And during the succeeding centuries, many more Arab tribes moved from southern Iraq to the western part of Khuzestan.

For several centuries Khuzestan, as with many other Iranian provinces prior to the era of the Pahlavi dynasty, had been a semi-autonomous part of Persia under the control of an Imperial Governor-Generalate appointed by the Shah. The Zagros mountains separated the province from the central Iranian plateau. The governor-general, who resided part of the year in the cool highlands at Shushtar or Dezful, often left real exercise of power to local leaders who bid and quarrelled amongst each other for the position of tax farmer.

Of these factions, the Muhaisin clan, led by Sheikh Jabir al-Kaabi, became the strongest and under his leadership the Bani Kaab were reunified under a single authority, the capital of the tribe being moved from the village of Fallahiyah to the flourishing port city of Mohammerah. Unlike previous leaders of the Bani Kaab, Jabir maintained law and order, and established Mohammerah as a free port and sheikhdom, of which he was Sheikh. Jabir also became the Imperial-appointed governor-general of the province.

== British and Russian interventions ==
Throughout the 19th century, Russia and Britain contended for control of Persia. Both attempted to influence or intimidate the Qajar Shahs. Russia dominated the northern parts of Iran while Britain dominated the south. Khuzestan was an area of particular interest to Britain, originally because of its strategic location, and later due its vast oilfields. For more than a century, Britain was a dominant influence in the area.

- 1856–1857 Anglo-Persian War Following a trivial dispute between the British ambassador to Persian and the Shah's prime minister, Britain declares war and sends troops up through the Persian Gulf. They march through Khuzestan and up the Karun River as far as Ahvaz. The Persian government concedes and at the Treaty of Paris, Persia surrenders Herat and surrounding territories to Afghanistan. British troops withdraw from Khuzestan.
- 1870 End of construction for the Indo-European telegraph line from Calcutta to London. The line passes through Iran.
- 1878 The British establish a consulate at Bushehr, just down the Persian Gulf coast from Khuzestan.
- 1888 The British firm of Lynch Brothers is granted a concession to run a line of steamers on the Karun River, as far to Ahvaz.
- 1908 Oil discovered in Khuzestan.
- 1909 The Anglo-Persian Oil Company is founded. The company constructs drill rigs, refineries, large industrial facilities, and British-style housing for overseers. The Arab character of the western region of the province is diluted by immigration from other parts of Iran. The area becomes one of the more prosperous areas of Persia. The oil company pays royalties to the Qajar Shah as well as to the provincial governor-general, Sheikh Khaz'al Khan of Mohammarah.
- 1914–1918 During World War I, Britain lands troops in Khuzestan, using it as a staging area for an invasion of Ottoman territories in what is now Iraq.
- 1921 British officials support a coup mounted by Colonel Reza Khan, which overthrows the Qajar dynasty and eventually establishes the Pahlavi dynasty in 1925. The British believed that Reza Khan would be more effective at holding the country together and resisting Russian (now Bolshevik) incursions from the north.
- 1925 Reza Khan is crowned the new Shah and has Sheikh Khaz'al deposed, who is held under house arrest in Tehran. Reza Shah attempts to forcibly settle the tribal groups of Khuzestan and impose strict central government control.
- 1929 The Trans-Iranian Railway is built across the Karun River at Ahvaz.
- 1936 Sheikh Khazal dies in Tehran. The province is renamed Khuzestan, a return to the name of the province before the Safavid era. (see origin of the name Khuzestan).
- 1939–1945 During World War II, Britain again wishes to use Khuzestan for military purposes. The Persian government objects. In 1941, Britain participated in Anglo-Soviet invasion of Iran which overthrowed Reza Shah and replaces him with his son, Mohammad Reza Pahlavi. A British military base is again established in Khuzestan.

== Modernization and turmoil ==
- 1951–1954 Under the democratically elected Prime Minister, Mohammed Mossadegh, the Anglo-Iranian Oil Company is nationalized. Mosaddegh is ousted in a joint CIA/MI6-organized coup (dubbed Operation Ajax), which installs the formerly exiled Shah Mohammad Reza Pahlavi to the throne as the de facto dictator, and the oil companies resume control. However, they now pay higher royalties to the Iranian government.
- 1946–1979 As with his father before him, Mohammad Reza Pahlavi attempts to modernize Iran by imposing strict central government control and limiting local autonomy and culture. Minority languages are suppressed and not allowed to be taught in schools. The government seized the settled tribal lands of the Arabs and Lurs for the oil industry or government purposes. Ethnic discontent simmered during Mohammad Reza Pahlavi's reign. However, overt expression of unhappiness was limited, as the state energetically suppressed dissent.

== The Iranian Revolution ==
Rampant corruption, oppressive secret police, and autocratic rule made the Pahlavi shah less and less popular. His attempts to modernize Iran and break the power of the Shi'a clergy antagonized religious leaders and devout Iranians. In 1979, a loose alliance of students, parties from both the left and the right, and Shi'a Islamists forced the Shah from power. The Shi'a clergy eventually seize power and establish the theocratic Islamic Republic.

Following the revolution, there were several regional uprisings. Khuzestan was hit by a wave of unrest led by Arabs demanding both autonomy and an end to discrimination. The uprising was suppressed by Iranian security forces, with more than a hundred dead on both sides.

== The Iran–Iraq War ==
Disruption in the central government made various Iranian regional separatists bolder. In 1980, six Khuzestani Arab separatists temporarily seized the Iranian embassy in London (see Iranian Embassy Siege).

Saddam Hussein, the Iraqi dictator, supported the separatists. Initially, it emerged they wanted autonomy for Khuzestan. Later they demanded the release of 91 of their comrades held in Ayatollah Khomeini's jails. Only after the incident was over did it emerge that Iraq had trained and armed the gunmen to embarrass Iran, and it would become a prelude to the Iran–Iraq War.

Soon after the embassy drama in 1980, Iraqi troops invaded Khuzestan. They expected that the Arab inhabitants would welcome them as liberators, and that the Iranian army would be too weak to resist them. Both expectations were delusory. After initial gains, the Iraqis were repulsed and pushed back to the old borders. The war ended in 1988.

=== Aftermath ===
Khuzestan was devastated by the war. What used to be Iran's largest refinery at Abadan was destroyed, never to fully recover. Many of the famous palm plantations were annihilated, cities were destroyed, and historical sites were demolished. Many of the inhabitants were forced to flee into neighboring provinces, which struggled to cope with the influx of refugees. Not all of the refugees have been able to return to their former homes.

The central government has made some repairs in major urban centers and rebuilt a few tourist attractions, such as Shush Castle. There is a new steelworks in Ahvaz, and a new dam on the Karun River. However, some sites, such as the city of Khorramshahr, are still desolate ruins.

Khuzestanis have protested, claiming that oil revenues from their province are used elsewhere and they are left to cope with the aftermath of the war as best they can. There has been much unrest among Arabic-speaking and Arab-heritage Khuzestanis, who claim that they face discrimination. Riots and mass arrests made international news in 2005.

== See also ==
- Ahvaz
- Ai-Toghdï
- History of Iran
- Arabs of Khuzestan
- Origin of the name Khuzestan
- Occupation of Khuzestan by Muslims
- Politics of Khuzestan

== References and further reading ==
- History of Persia (2 volumes), Sir Percy Sykes (1915)
- Tarikh-e Pahnsad Saal-e Khuzestan (Five Hundred Year History of Khuzestan) by Ahmad Kasravi
- Jang-e Iran va Britannia dar Mohammerah (The Iran-British War in Mohammerah) by Ahmad Kasravi
- Tarikh-e Bist Saal-e Iran (Twenty Year History of Iran) by Hossein Maki (Tehran, 1945–47)
- Hayat-e Yahya (The Life of Yahya) by Yahya Dolatabadi (Tehran, 1948–52)
- Tarikh-e Ejtemai va Edari Doreieh Qajarieh (The Administrative and Social History of the Qajar Era) by Abdollah Mostofi (Tehran, 1945–49) ISBN 1-56859-041-5 (for the English translation)
- Amin al-Rayhani, Muluk al-Arab, aw Rihlah fi al-bilad al-Arabiah (in two volumes, 1924–25), Vol 2, part 6 on Kuwait.
- Ansari, Mostafa -- The History of Khuzistan, 1878-1925, unpublished PhD. dissertation, University of Chicago, 1974
- W. Barthold (1984). "Luristan and Khuzistan". An Historical Geography of Iran. Translated by Svat Soucek. Princeton University Press. pp. 180–194. ISBN 978-1-4008-5322-9.
- Khuzestan: The First Front in the War on Iran? by Zoltán Grossman (ZNetwork, 2005)
- Escalation of this War Could Shatter Iran into Ethnic Enclaves by Zoltán Grossman (Counterpunch, 2026)
