= Kindyria =

Town of ancient Lycaonia

Coordinates: 38°08′55″N 32°12′50″E

Kindyria was a town of ancient Lycaonia, inhabited in Roman and Byzantine times. The name does not occur among ancient authors but is inferred from epigraphic and other evidence.

Its site is located near Demiroluk, Kadınhanı, Konya Province, Turkey.
