= Susiana =

Susiana Susiana
- Historical region
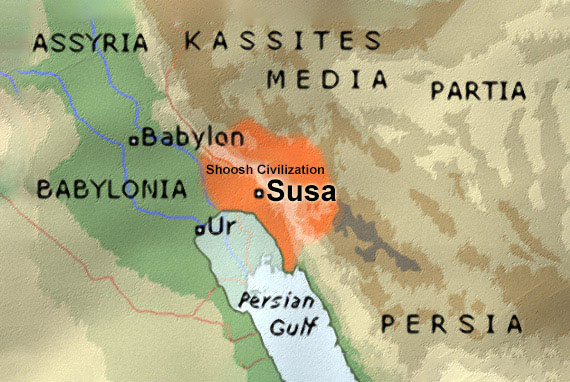

- Location of Susiana in Iran
- Coordinates: 31°20′19.6″N 48°41′51.3″E
- Country: Iran
- Modern province: Khuzestan Province
- Historical period: 3rd millennium BC
- Founded by: Elamites and early inhabitants of the Susa Plain
- Major city: Susa
- Region: Khuzestan Province
- Civilization: Elam
- Achaemenid satrapy: Susiana

Susiana (Persian: سوزیانا; [ˈsuziɒːnɒ]) (Note: Also romanized as Susiânâ and Susiyana) was an ancient cultural and geographical region located in southwestern Iran. It broadly corresponds to the alluvial lowlands surrounding the city of Susa, forming the core area of the early Elamite civilization, which today make up most of modern Khuzestan Province.

Susiana is best understood as the Susa plain, an ecological and cultural zone influenced both by the Iranian plateau and by Mesopotamia. Archaeological surveys show continuous settlement in the region from the Neolithic period onward, especially at sites such as Chogha Bonut and Chogha Mish. Recent excavations at Tappeh Senjar have added substantial data on the development of Susiana from the Proto-Elamite to the Shimashki periods.

In the 3rd millennium BC, Susiana formed the central lowland zone of the Elamite Kingdom. During the Achaemenid Empire, Susiana was organized as a formal satrapy, and in later periods it was frequently associated with or identified as Elymais. Due to shifting borders and ambiguous terminology in historical sources, the exact relationship between Susiana, Elam, and Elymais remains debated.

== Geography ==
The territory of Susiana corresponds roughly to the present-day Khuzestan Province in southwestern Iran. The region includes the Karkheh and Karun river basins and the extensive Susa plain. This fertile lowland functioned as a cultural crossroads between highland Iran and Mesopotamia.

== Historical development ==
=== Early periods ===
Neolithic and Chalcolithic occupation is well documented at sites such as Chogha Bonut and Chogha Mish, which illustrate early administrative and cultural connections with Mesopotamia. The emergence of Proto-Elamite administrative systems is attested throughout the Susa plain.

=== Relationship with Elam ===
For many decades, scholars equated Elam with Susiana, assuming that Susa represented the political center of all Elamite polities. Two major developments have changed this view:

1. The identification of Tal-e Malyan (Anshan) in modern Fars as a principal highland center of the Elamite world.
2. The conclusion that Susa and Elam were historically distinct entities, though often politically connected.

=== Old Babylonian and Middle Elamite periods ===
After the fall of the Third Dynasty of Ur in 2004 BCE, Susiana was annexed by the Elamites. The Epartid (sukkalmah) dynasty originated in the highlands but ruled over Susiana and the Susa plain. During the Middle Elamite period (1500–1100 BCE), rulers titled themselves “Kings of Anshan and Susa,” controlling territories equivalent to modern Khuzestan, Fars, and portions of Bushehr.

== Archaeology ==
Susiana is one of the best-documented archaeological regions of Iran. Major sites include:

- Susa – principal political and cultural center
- Chogha Mish – major proto-urban and administrative center
- Chogha Bonut – earliest documented settlement in lowland Susiana
- Tappeh Senjar – key site for the 3rd millennium BC sequence of Susiana

The region preserves crucial evidence for early writing, administrative tokens, pottery industries, and long-distance trade with Mesopotamia.
