= Afshar rugs =

Afshar is a handwoven rug style produced by the Turkic Afshar tribe, a semi-nomadic group principally located in the mountainous areas surrounding the modern region of Iranian Azerbaijan. An additional population of Afshar tribes-people is located in the Kuchan area in Razavi Khorasan Province of Iran and city of Kerman. Carpets in the Afshar style are known for their stylized floral geometric designs, tribal artistry, and a characteristic palette of rust and blue color tones.

== History ==
Since the Safavid era, the Turkic tribal group Afshar migrated from their origins in Central Asia to settle in Iranian Azerbaijan, Azerbaijan republic, and Eastern Turkey. This background led to the inclusion of regional influences on Afshar weaving, resulting in a distinctive aesthetic that incorporates elements of several village and nomadic Persian rug styles, as well as Southern Persian design influences. Caucasian rug influences are also felt.

== Design ==
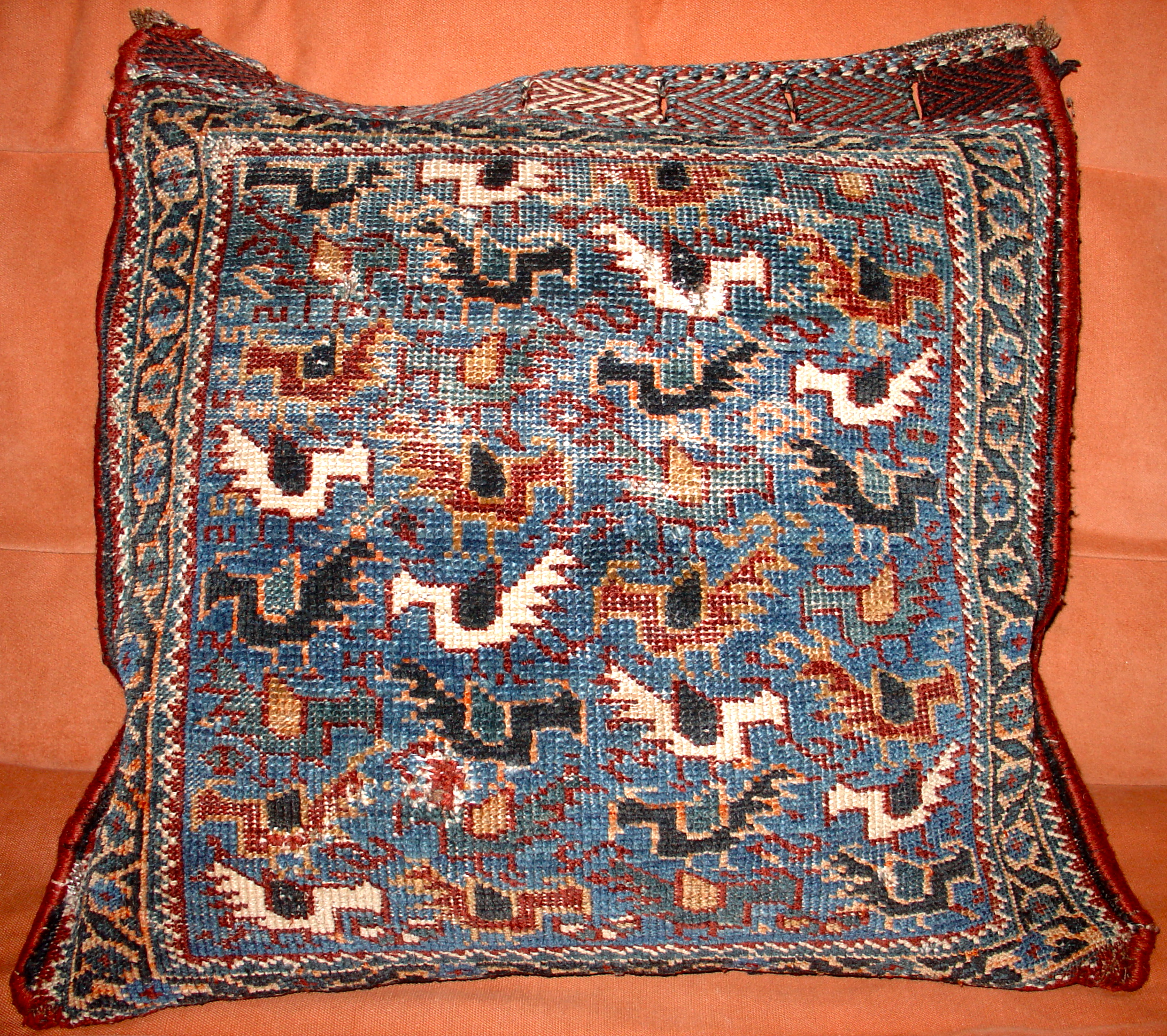
Afshar bag

Antique Afshar rugs from the 19th century are characterized by their quality of craftsmanship and wool. Colors are saturated: deep indigo, carnelian, saffron and ochre tones predominate. While complex repeating all-over designs are prevalent, Afshar weavers also drew upon Southern Persian carpet imagery, with boteh motifs, shrub and occasionally "Tree of Life" compositions encountered as well. Kurdish influences are evident in angular medallion format rugs, as well as in the general spontaneity encountered in several original flower and bird designs.

Afshar rugs are usually found in the area size format, ranging from 3 ft x 4 ft to 4-5 ft x 7 ft. Larger room size pieces are rarely encountered. Longer corridor carpets (5 ft x 10 ft) are occasionally found, as are the small mats and bag faces consistent with their nomadic tribal heritage.
