= Atlantı, Kadınhanı =

Atlantı Atlantı
- Neighborhood
- Location in Turkey
- Coordinates: 38°26′25″N 32°9′57″E
- Country: Turkey
- Province: Konya Province
- Neighborhood: Kadınhanı

Area
  - Total: 3.18 km^{2} (1.23 sq mi)

Population (2022)
  - Total: 2,284
  - Density: 718/km^{2} (1,860/sq mi)
- Time zone: UTC+3 (UTC+3 (TRT))
- Postal code: 42800
- Local dialing code: 332

Atlantı is a settlement in Kadınhanı District, Konya Province, Turkey. In 2022 Atlantı had an estimated population of 2,284.

Atlantı was originally a village of the Bozulus tribal confederation. It is near an ancient town of Lycaonia named Aralla.

== Population ==
Population data from 2007 to 2022
2022	2,284
2019	2,389
2018	2,455
2017	2,460
2016	2,524
2015	2,525
2014	2,581
2013	2,662
2012	2,712
2011	2,891
2010	3,121
2009	3,511
2008	4,095
2007	3,088
