= Abbas Alizadeh =

Iranian archaeologist

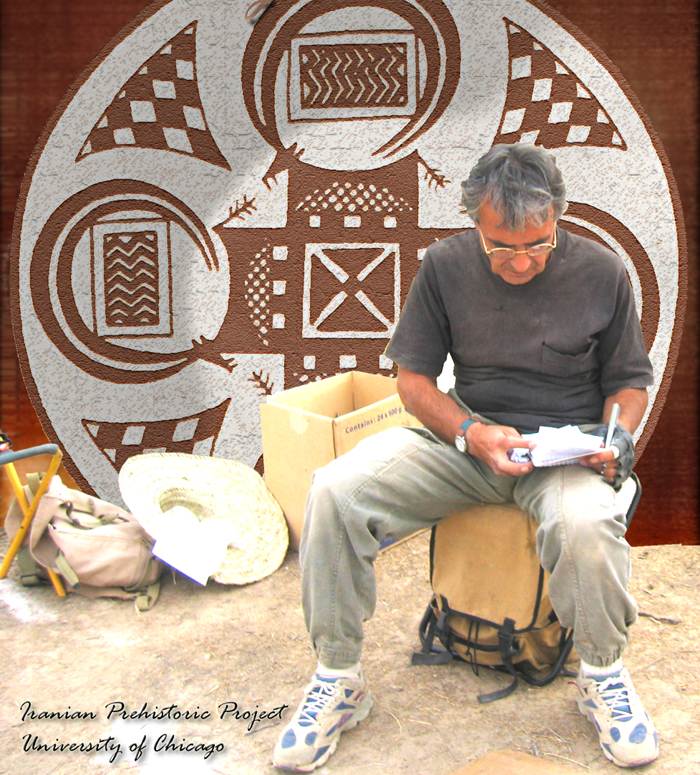
Abbas Alizadeh

Abbas Alizadeh (born 1951) is an Iranologist and Persian archaeologist. Alizadeh is a senior research associate at the Institute for the Study of Ancient Cultures (ISAC) of The University of Chicago, who works with the Iranian Prehistoric Project. He has supervised foreign teams of archaeologists working throughout Iran.

He is known for his investigations of Chogha Bonut.

In May 2021, he flew to Iran and was detained by the Iranian secret police who put him under house arrest. The Institute for the Study of Ancient Cultures (ISAC) said they would withhold thousands of Elamite tablets from Iran until he was released. He was then released and flew back to the United States on August 19, 2021.
