= Khorjin =

Decorative carpet bag

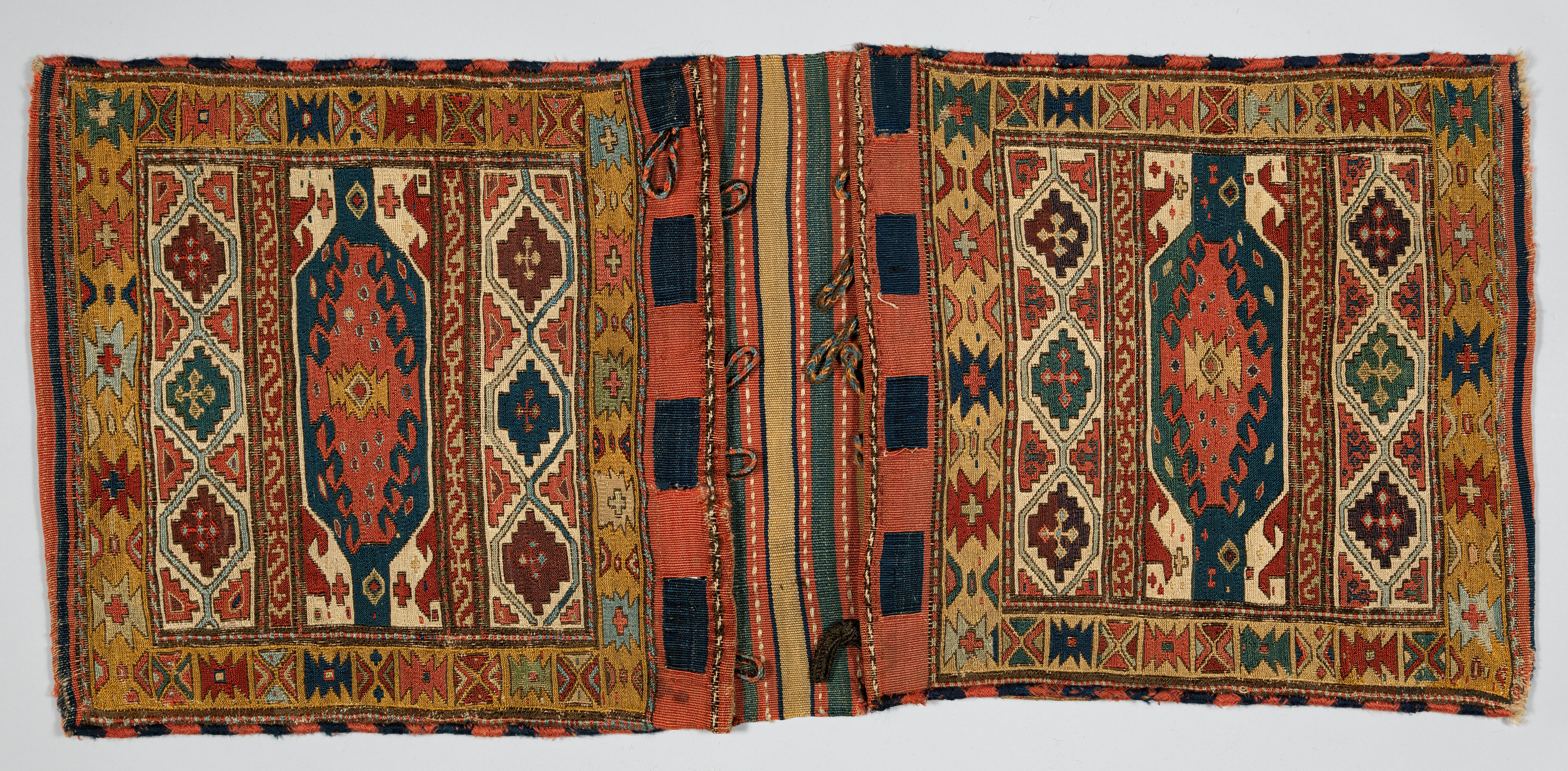
Shahsevan khorjin saddlebag from Northwestern Iran or Azerbaijan, c. 1800–25, held by the Metropolitan Museum of Art

A khorjin is a type of decorative carpet bag made across Greater Iran and Central Asia.

Hand-knotted carpets and hand woven kilims (flatwoven textiles) were made by various nomadic tribes of the Middle East and Central Asia, including the Baloch, the Turkmen, the Afshars, the Bakhtyari, the Qashqai, and the Kurds, among others. The bags and the larger rugs were woven in the same techniques as The most common technique is hand-knotted pile, but many tribal bags were also done in the various flat woven techniques including plain weave (kilim weave), soumac technique and other less common techniques. They range in size from small pouches for valuable personal possessions to larger handbags and saddlebags.

Bags were used for transporting goods while on migration, and also served as storage containers to be used in the tent or yurt. There are also specialized bags such as bags for carrying mirrors, bags for carrying the Qur'an, bags for carrying tent stakes and more. Often the bags are known by specific names based on the function they served. Some common bag names are "cuval" (camel bag), "khorjin" (double-sided donkey bags), "taache" (grain bag), and "mafrash" (bedding bag) to name just a few.

The back panel of a bag will often have little or no design. On bags with knotted pile faces, the back of the bag will usually be executed in a plain woven kilim technique.

Seen as a type of Oriental rug, khorjin have been sought after by collectors and museums in Europe, the United States and Japan since the late 19th century.

== Bag face ==
From the collectors point of view, the front or the face of the bag is much more interesting and more collectible. Often, with antique bags, the backs of the bag have been separated and discarded at some point and only the bagface remains.

== See also ==
- Persian rug
