= Helene J. Kantor =

American archaeologist

- Kantor in 1989
- Born: July 15, 1919; Chicago, Illinois, U.S.
- Died: January 13, 1993 (aged 73); Mitchell Hospital, Chicago, Illinois, U.S.
- Education: University of Chicago
- Awards: Percia Schimmel Archeological Prize
- Scientific career
- Fields: Archeology, art history
- Workplaces: University of Chicago Oriental Institute
- Thesis: (1945)

Helene J. Kantor (July 15, 1919 – January 13, 1993) was a Near Eastern Archaeologist and Art Historian in the Near Eastern Languages and Civilizations of the Oriental Institute at the University of Chicago, best known for her work at Chogha Mish from 1961 through 1978.

== Early life and education ==
Kantor was born in Chicago in 1919 with congenital myopathy, a rare muscular disease that limited her activity and eventually ended her career. Her father was psychologist Jacob Robert Kantor. She attended Indiana University Bloomington and received a B.A. in Zoology and Biology at the age of 19. She earned her Ph.D. in 1945 from the University of Chicago.

== Research career ==
In 1944, while still a student at the University of Chicago, she published an article entitled "The Final Phase of Predynastic Culture, Gerzean or Semainean" in the Journal of Near Eastern Studies. Her most noted work, The Aegean and the Orient in the Second Millennium B.C., was published in 1947.

Kantor retired as Professor Emeritus of Archaeology at the University of Chicago. Aside from her primary work at Chogha Mish, she saved the site of nearby Chogha Bonut from destruction by modern development and conducted two seasons of investigation there in 1976/77 and 1977/78.

== Awards and honors ==
- In 1984, Kantor received the Israel Museum's Percia Schimmel Archeological Prize for her lifetime achievements.
- In 2004, the Archaeological Institute of America established the Helene J. Kantor Memorial Lecture.
