= Afshar people =

Oghuz Turkic tribe

Afshar
- Tamgha of Afshar according to Mahmud al-Kashgari, which represents Bonelli's eagle according to Abu al-Ghazi Bahadur

Regions with significant populations
- Iran; 200,000–342,000; Turkey, Afghanistan

Languages
- Afshar dialect, Persian, Turkish, Turkmen

Religion
- Islam

Related ethnic groups
- Oghuz Turks

Afshar (Azerbaijani: Əfşar افشار; Turkish: Avşar, Afşar; Turkmen: Owşar اوْوشار; Persian: افشار, romanized: Afshār) is a tribe of Oghuz Turkic origin that split into several groups in Iran, Turkey and Afghanistan. Today, Afshars mainly inhabit Iran, where they remain a largely nomadic group. They are variously grouped as a branch of the Azerbaijanis, or a separate group of Turkomans (a common general term used for people of Oghuz Turkic origin).

Afshar means "obedient". According to Rashid-al-Din Hamadani, Afshar, the eponymous founder of the tribe, was a son of Yildiz Khan, the third son of Oghuz Khan. During the Seljuk conquests of the 11th century, they moved from Central Asia into the Middle East. They are noted in history for being one of the Qizilbash tribes that helped establish the Safavid and later the Afsharid dynasty of Iran. Nader Shah, who became the monarch of Iran in 1736, was from the Qereklu clan (Persian: قرخلو) of Afshars. The founders of the Germiyanids, and the Khalkhal Khanate were also of Afshar descent. The founder of the Karamanids may have also been of Afshar descent.

== Name ==
Rashid-al-Din Hamadani explained the name Afshar as meaning "nimble, agile". According to linguist Gyula Németh, the name Afshar derives from the Turkic root auš- 'to obey', which appears in the Tatar and Crimean Tatar languages. Thus, Afshar means "obedient".

The name of this tribe appears as Afshar in the works of Mahmud al-Kashgari (11th century) and Fakhruddin Mubarak Shah (early 13th century), whereas Rashid al-Din Hamadani (early 14th century) and those who relied on his account, including Yazıcıoğlu (15th century) and Abu’l-Ghazī (17th century), record it in the form Avshar. In sources predating the Mongol invasions, the form Afshar, consistent with the usage found in Mahmud al-Kashgari and Fakhr al-Din Mubarakshah, is predominant. Although the pronunciation Avşar became more widespread in Anatolia between the 14th and 17th centuries, in the Safavid realm the tribe continued to be referred to exclusively as Afshar. Today, inhabitants of villages and tribal settlements in Iran affiliated with this lineage still identify themselves by that name.

Both Mahmud al-Kashgari and Rashid al-Din, alongside the other Oghuz tribes, recorded the tamgas (tribal emblems) of the Afshars. In addition, Rashid al-Din states that the Afshars shared a common totem— a bird of prey— with three closely related tribes (Kızık, Baydili, and Kargın), and that the right side of the sheep constituted their ritual portion (toy ülüşü) in accordance with customary law. The same author further explains the meaning of the tribal name as “agile, keen on hunting.”

== History ==
The earliest mention of the Afshar tribe can be found in the Dīwān Lughāt al-Turk by Mahmud Kashgari, who flourished in c. 1075. Kashgari mentioned the Afshar tribe sixth in his list of 22 Oghuz Turkic sub-tribes, and pointed out that the sub-tribal names are those of their ancestors "who gave birth to them in older times".

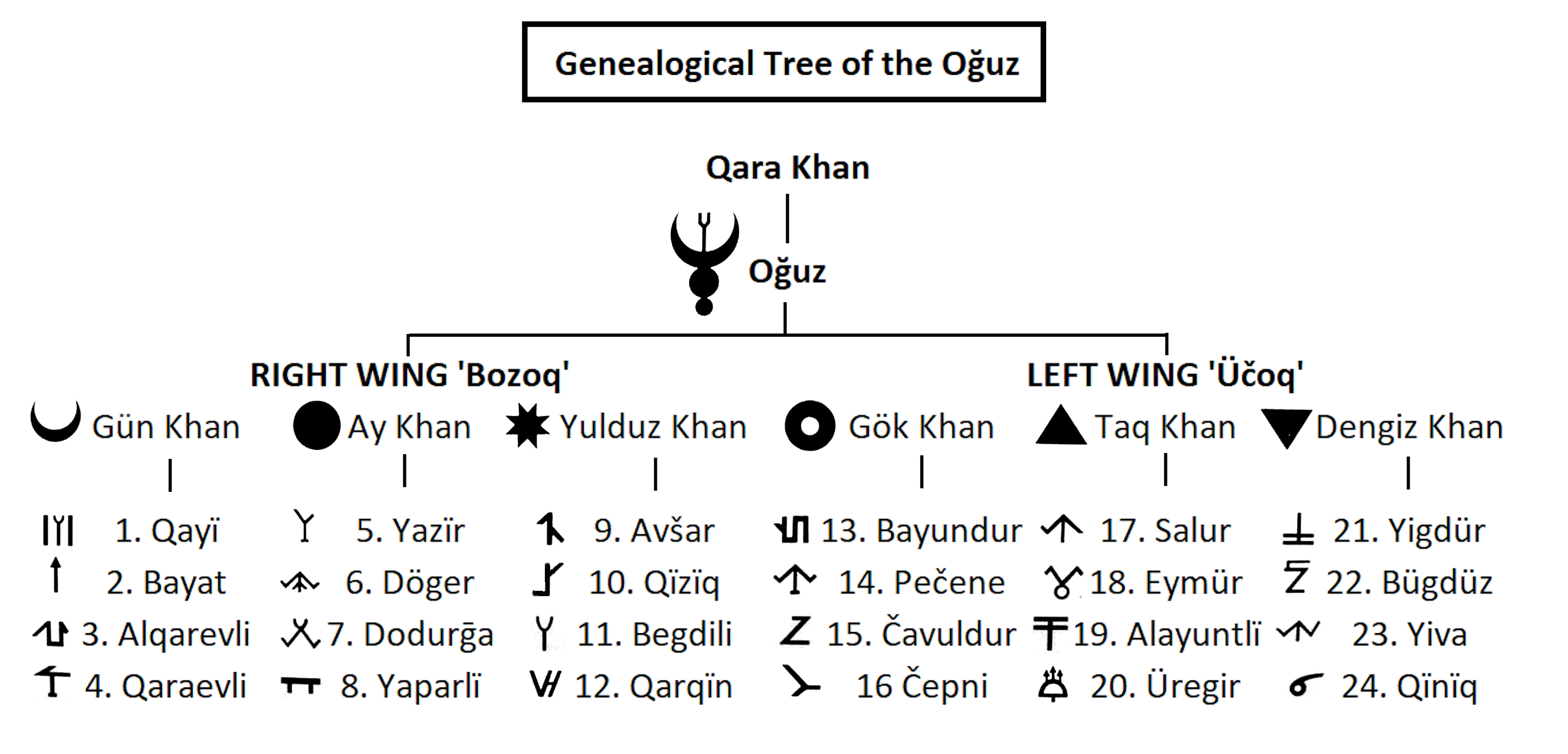
Afshar (No.9, "Avşar") in the genealogical tree of the Oghuz

In the 11th century, the first Afshar tribesmen entered Iran and Anatolia from Transoxania along with other Oghuz invaders. More members of the Afshar tribe may have arrived during the Mongol conquests during the second half of the 13th century. For a period afterwards, the Afshar tribe is untraceable in historic records as a distinct group, for they are subsumed under label of Turkoman. Furthermore, it seems that the different Turkoman elements were subject to diverse re-grouping processes, insofar that when new "tribes" came into existence, only some were able to maintain traditional Oghuz tribal names, such as "Afshar".

Georg Stöber explains that in the political environment of the time the ranking of the different groups supported by (constructed) genealogies became increasingly important. Rashid al-Din Hamadani (died 1318) believed that the ancestor of the tribe was a person named "Afshar", who in turn was genealogically linked to the hero Oghuz. The Afshar tribe were also said to be part of the right wing (bozuq) of the Oghuz army.

In the 12th century, two governors (father and son) from the Afshar tribe held Khuzistan (southwestern Iran) for 40 years. The Karamanid dynasty, who held sway in the Middle Taurus (modern-day Turkey), may have been of Afshar descent. Afshar tribesmen are said to have belonged to nomadic groups in the region of Sivas, and the tribe was part of the Ak Koyunlu Turkoman tribal confederacy.

In later years, many Afshars moved to the east, where, as part of the Qizilbash, they aided in establishing the Safavid dynasty of Iran. Other Afshars remained in Anatolia however, which at the time was Ottoman soil. There, on Ottoman soil, they formed separate groups. During the 19th century nomads in the Çukurova, who were known to migrate between Syria in the winter and Anatolia in the summer, were forcibly settled by the Ottoman Darwish Pasha in the area of Göksun and Kayseri; in the mid-twentieth century, villagers of Afshar descent could still be found in the vicinity of the latter two areas.

The eastward movement of the Afshars from Anatolia is connected to the foundation of Iran's Safavid dynasty. The Afshars served Shah Ismail I (r. 1501–1524), as part of the Qizilbash tribes that were likely blends of each other and also transcended Turkomans. Stöber therefore explains that the 16th-century Afshars cannot wholly descend from the tribe attested in the 11th century.

Nader Shah, ruler of Iran from 1736 to 1747, belonged to the Afshar tribe.

== Sub-tribes ==
List of Afshar tribes are: Alplū, Arašlū, Bekešlū, Gündüzlü, Imirlü, Köse Aḥmedlū, Köselü, Pāpāglū, Qāsemlū, Qereḵlū, Karalu, Karamanlu, Salmanlu, Sindelli, Tur Ali Hacılu, Receplü, Balabanlu, Karabudaklı and Qirqlū.

== In Turkey ==
Afshars in Turkey mostly live in Sarız, Tomarza, Yozgat and Pınarbaşı districts of Kayseri province, as well as in several villages in Adana, Kahramanmaraş and Gaziantep provinces.

While Afshars had remained nomadic and retained their Oghuz lifestyle, forced settlements caused them to adopt a settled lifestyle. A resistance against Ottomans under spiritual leadership of the bard Dadaloğlu and local Afshar lord Kozanoğlu was proven futile.

=== Among the Bozulus ===
In 1570-71, within the Bozulus, three branches of Diyarbakir Afshars under Mehmed Kethüdâ numbered around 804, 367 and 109. Apart from these, there were many more Afshar branches under the administration of other kethüdas.

In the 17th century, some of Bozulus Afshars migrated to Central Anatolia and settled mostly in Karaman Eyalet. Other ones, especially members of Damascus Turkmens remained in their old settlements. This branch, which is called boz ulus mândesi ('Bozulus remnant') on Ottoman documents, were later settled in Rakka Eyalet, however many of the tribesmen belonging to this community migrated to Western Anatolia.

In 1716, the Köpeklü branch of Bozulus Afshars were seen in Mihaliç kaza. On the other hand, some other Afshars of Bozulus migrated to Iran during the reign of Shah Abbas.

=== Culture ===
Several folk dances in Afshar-inhabited areas are known after the name of the tribe. Afshar kaba (Turkish: Avşar kabası) is danced around the Barak Plain in Gaziantep. Afshar halay or ağırlama (Avşar halayı or Avşar ağırlaması) is known around Kırşehir, Yozgat, Keskin, as well as Kayseri, while Afshar zeybek (Avşar zeybeği) is found around Burdur, Antalya, Denizli, and Muğla.

=== Genetics ===
In an Afshar village near Ankara where, according to oral tradition, the ancestors of the inhabitants came from Central Asia, the researchers found that 57% of the villagers had haplogroup L, 13% had haplogroup Q and 3% had haplogroup N. The high rate of haplogroup L observed in this study, which is most common in South Asia, was difficult for researchers to explain and could not be traced back to any specific geographic location, and authors said it would be difficult to associate this haplogroup with the Turkic migrations, given the paucity of evidence.

== In Turkmenistan ==
During the reign of Nader Shah, a group of Afshars assimilated with a couple of modern Turkmen tribes that currently live in the territory of present-day Turkmenistan, such as Gekleng, Murcheli, Esgi, and Ersary. It is known that they formed a backbone of the Murcheli tribe. The Afshars also played a major role in the formation of the Turkmen tribe of Alili.

== Dynasties ==
- Afsharid dynasty
- Alaiye
- Aydınids
- Beylik of Lâdik
- Germiyanids, claimed by Ottoman historian Hayrullah Efendi and repeated by several modern historians
- Karamanids
- Karabakh Khanate

== Notable people ==
- Ai-Toghdï
- Junayd of Aydın, ruler of Smyrna
- Nader Shah, founder of the Afsharid dynasty of Iran
- Nure Sofi, founder of the Karamanid beylik
- Zulfaqar Khan Afshar, founder of the Zanjan Khanate
- Dadaloğlu, Turkish ashik
- Kâzım Karabekir, Turkish general, politician
- Yusuf Halaçoğlu, Turkish historian, politician
- Dean Mahomed, Indian traveller, soldier, surgeon, and entrepreneur

== See also ==
- Javanshir clan
- Iranian Turks
- Afshar rugs

== Sources ==
- Bulookbashi, Ali A.; Negahban, Farzin (2008). "Afshār". In Madelung, Wilferd; Daftary, Farhad (eds.). Encyclopaedia Islamica Online. Brill Online. ISSN 1875-9831.
- Sümer, Faruk (1991). "AVŞAR". In Madelung, Wilferd; Daftary, Farhad (eds.). Encyclopaedia Islamica Online. Brill Online. ISSN 1875-9831.
- Caferoğlu, Ahmet (1934). "Şarkta ve garpta Azerî lehçesi tetkikleri" [Studies of the Azeri dialect in the east and the west]. ABY. 3.
- Oberling, P. (1984). "AFŠĀR". In Yarshater, Ehsan (ed.). Encyclopædia Iranica. Vol. I/6: Afghanistan–Ahriman. London and New York: Routledge & Kegan Paul. pp. 582–586. ISBN 978-0-71009-095-9.
- Stöber, Georg (2010). "Afshār". In Fleet, Kate; Krämer, Gudrun; Matringe, Denis; Nawas, John; Rowson, Everett (eds.). Encyclopaedia of Islam (3rd ed.). Brill Online. ISSN 1873-9830.
- Varlık, Mustafa Çetin (1974). Germiyan-oğulları tarihi (1300-1429) (in Turkish). Ankara: Atatürk University Press. OCLC 6807984.
