= Aralla =

Town of ancient Lycaonia

Coordinates: 38°26′06″N 32°09′07″E

Aralla was a town of ancient Lycaonia, inhabited in Roman times. The name, which does not occur among ancient authors, is inferred from epigraphic and other evidence.

Its site is tentatively located near Atlantı, Kadınhanı, Konya Province, Turkey.
