= Chogha Bonut =

Prehistoric settlement in Iran

- Location within Iran
- 32°13′19″N 48°30′18″E
- Type: Settlement
- Location: Khuzestan province, Iran

Chogha Bonut (Persian Choghā bonut) is an archaeological site in south-western Iran, located in the Khuzistan Province. The site is about 20 km southeast of Dezful, and 5 km west of Chogha Mish, another ancient site. It is believed that the site was settled as early as 7200 BCE, making it the oldest lowland village in south-western Iran.

This settlement on the Susiana Plain played a big role in the early Elam civilization. Later, this area became dominated by Susa. The site is important because it preserves a record of preceramic period settlement in Iran.

== Archaeology ==
The site has an area about 50 meters in diameter and about 5 meters in height. It was accidentally discovered in 1976 when the mound was being leveled for agribusiness development. Helene Kantor, then working at Chogha Mish nearby, hurried to the site and received a permit to investigate it.

Kantor remained for two seasons (1976/77 and 1977/78), but was unable to return in 1979 due to the Iranian Revolution. Abbas Alizadeh continued investigations at the site in 1996. His findings were published in 2003. It is one of the few Neolithic sites excavated since the Iranian revolution.

Among the finds were 41 clay tokens.

== Settlement ==
Five phases of occupation are documented at the site:

1. the Aceramic phase,
2. the Formative Ceramic phase, (Film Painted Ware)
3. the Archaic Susiana 0 phase (includes the Early Susiana period, ca. 5900 BCE),
4. the Late Middle Susiana phase (ca. 5200 BCE)
5. the Late Susiana 2 phase. (ca. 4400-4000 BCE)

== See also ==
- Prehistory of Iran
- Cities of the ancient Near East
