= Chogha Mish =

Archaeological site in Iran

Chogha Mish چغامیش
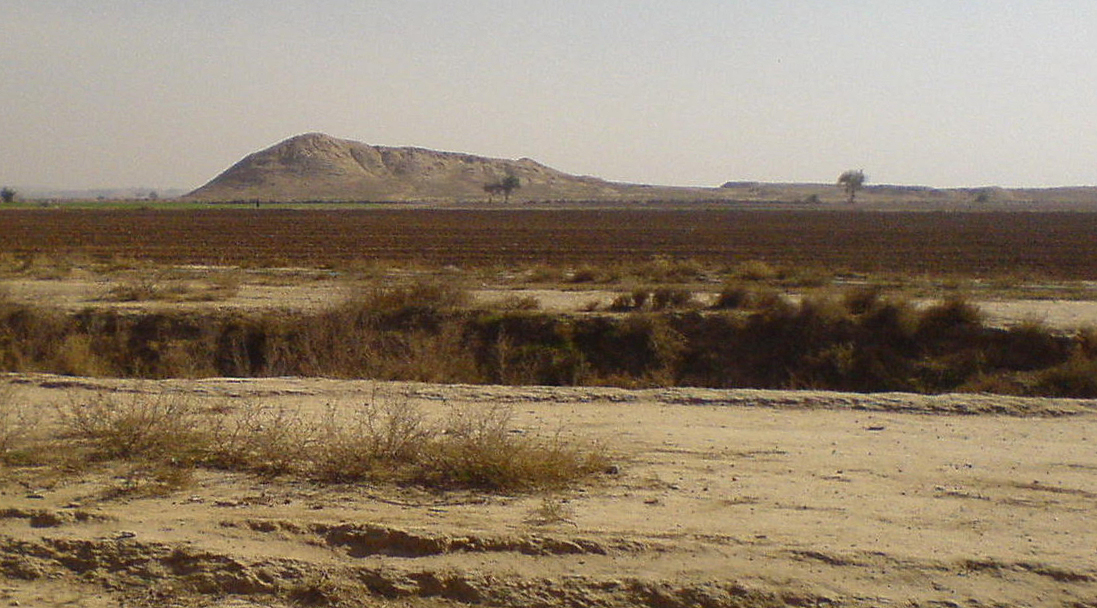

- Location within Iran
- 32°13′26.7″N 48°33′19.9″E
- Type: Settlement
- Location: Khuzestan province, Iran

Site notes
- Excavation dates: 1961-1978
- Archaeologists: Pinhas Delougaz, Helene J. Kantor
- Condition: In ruins

Iran National Heritage List
- Official name: Chogha Mish
- Type: Mound
- Designated: 1965
- Reference no.: 487
- Conservation organization: Cultural Heritage, Handicrafts and Tourism Organization of Iran

Choghā Mīsh (also Chogā Mīsh) (Persian: چغامیش, romanized: čoġā mīš) dating back to about 6800 BC, is the site of a Chalcolithic settlement located in the Khuzistan Province Iran on the eastern Susiana Plain. It was occupied at the beginning of 6800 BC and continuously from the Neolithic up to the Proto-Literate period (Uruk period), thus spanning the time periods from Archaic (7th millennium BC) through Proto-Elamite period (about 3100 BC to 2700 BC). After the decline of the site about 4400 BC, the nearby Susa, on the western Susiana Plain, became culturally dominant in this area. Chogha Mish is located just to the east of Dez River, and about 25 kilometers to the east from the ancient Susa. The similar, though much smaller site of Chogha Bonut lies six kilometers to the west.

== Archaeology ==
The site consists of a cone-shaped mound with a large terrace to the south. The mound is about 200 by 150 meters in area and rises to a height of about 27 meters above the plain. The terraces is about 400 meters by 300 meters in area with four small peaks.

Excavations were conducted at the site between 1961 and 1978, for a total of 11 seasons by the Oriental Institute and later including University of California at Los Angeles, under the direction of Pinhas Delougaz and Helene Kantor. At the uppermost levels were Elamite structures, including a fort, from early 2nd millennium BC times (generally called the Sukkalmah Dynasty period). Below this were found substantial remains from the Protoliterate period. Finds included uniform perforated stone disks, 4 to 5 centimeters in diameter, which are thought to be counters. A number of 4th millennium BC clay cylinder seal impressions were also found. Images on the seals are thought to include representations of spinning, weaving, and churning. About a quarter million beveled rim bowl fragments were found, many in association with kilns. This pottery is the marker for Uruk period culture. A notable find was a high quality Elamite cup made of soft bituminous stone. It was found in a pithoi burial jar placed in an old Protoliterate drain and the handle is carved into the form of a goat.

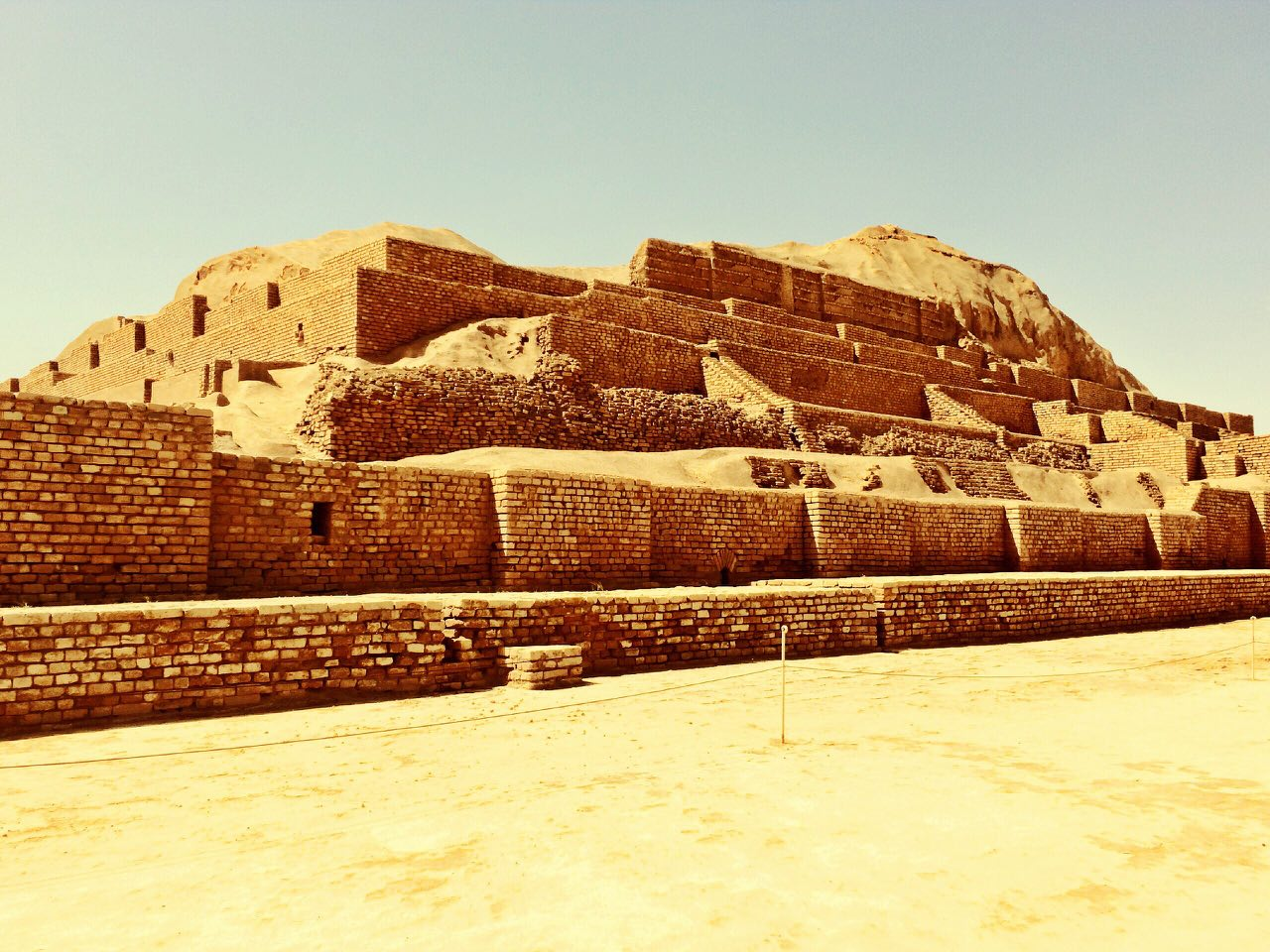
Chogha Zanbil

Pottery kiln were found at Chogha Mish dating from the Middle Susiana 1 period (roughly comparable to Late Ubaid Period), to the Uruk period. A pottery kiln at Chogha Mish now provides the earliest known prototype for the Early Dynastic Period (Mesopotamia) kilns. This ribbed double-chamber kiln (found in Trench XXV) was oval in plan and measured about 2 meters long and about 1.3 meters wide. It shows close parallels to the Early Dynastic II and III examples at Abu Salabikh and the Diyala River region.

Clay tokens were an early predecessor to writing. These were enclosed in hollow spheres of clay, envelopes, called bullae. About 135 of these tokens were found at Chogha Mish. They were of various shapes including small cones, spheres and discs. These tokens were common across the ancient Middle East in the early Uruk period c 3500–3200 BC. At least 28 envelopes, with seal impressions, were also found. Tokens and bullae were ephemeral in nature and almost always found in a secondary context as they were disposed of after use. Those found at Chogha Mish are contemporary with Uruk IV and the equivalent layer at Susa. One "numerical tablet" of the Uruk V period was also found.

The excavation's dig house at Qaleh Khalil was destroyed during the Iranian Revolution so many finds and records were either lost or destroyed.

== History ==
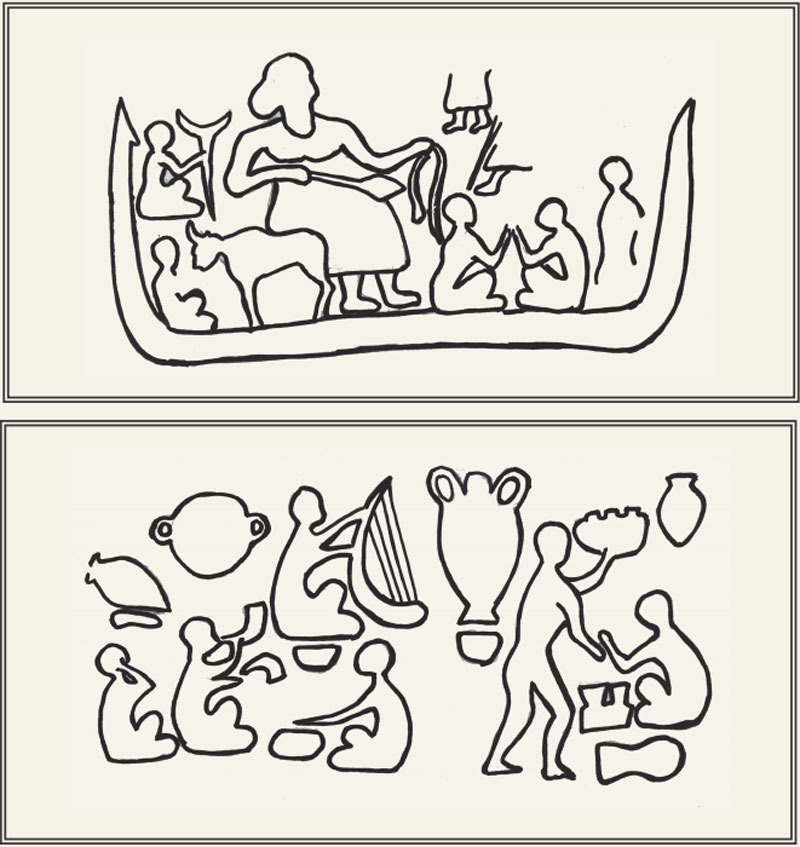
Above: Drawing of cylinder-seal found at Chogha Mish portraying a victorious city ruler seated in a boat with retinue and prisoners; Circa 3200 BC; diam. 4.2 x 6.9 cm. // Below: Musicians portrayed on pottery found at Chogha Mish

The site was lightly occupied beginning in the Archaic Susiana period, roughly the middle of the 6th millennium BC and into the following Middle Susiana period. It grew into its maximum size of 17 hectares in the Late Susiana period, roughly at the beginning of the 5th millennium BC. In the early half of the fifth millennium BC, the Chogha Mish main monumental building was destroyed. This became known as the 'Burnt Building'. This destruction of Chogha Mish also coincided with the abandonment of some other sites on the eastern part of the Susiana plain. The settlements of the subsequent period shifted more to the west, especially with the founding and rise of the city of Susa. The monumental buildings in Susa were then themselves destroyed around 4200 BC. The new pottery associated with this period was of the Late Susiana 1 type, featuring the 'dot motif'. By the Early Dynastic period in Mesopotamia the site was unoccupied. Occupation resumed in the early 2nd millennium BC during the Sukkalmah Dynasty period at a lesser level with about one third of the site occupied, primarily a large fort.

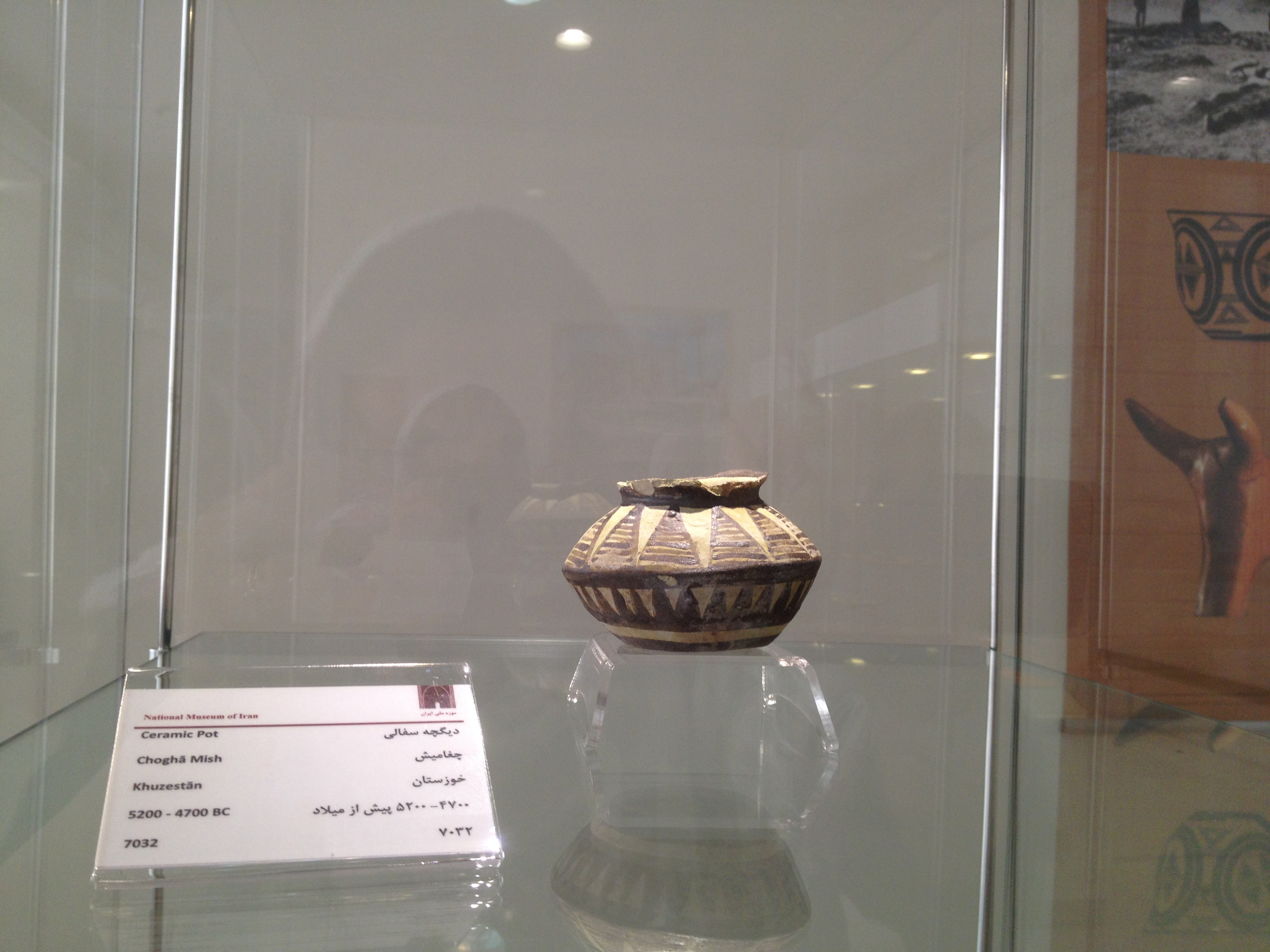
Ceramic pot - Chogha Mish - 5200 - 4200 BC - National museum of Iran

Chogha Mish provides important evidence for early connections between Susiana and Mesopotamia. The discoveries at Chogha Mish show that the Early Susiana period was contemporary with the Ubaid 1 period of southern Mesopotamia and the Samarra period of central Mesopotamia.

The Close-Line ware of Archaic Susiana 3 phase was contemporary with the Ubaid O phase, which antedates the previously known Ubaid sequence of southern Mesopotamia. The painted pottery of the Samarra period (contemporary with the Ubaid 1 = Eridu period in the south) in central Mesopotamia came later. According to archaeologists:

Prior to the fifth millennium B.C., Chogha Mish, with about 17 ha of occupation area, was the largest population center. Oriental Institute archaeological investigations at the site from 1969 to 1979 also showed increasing social and economic complexity until it was temporarily abandoned sometime in the early fifth millennium B.C., perhaps ca. 4800 BC.

== Gallery ==
Dezful Choghamish - UC Oriental Institute early
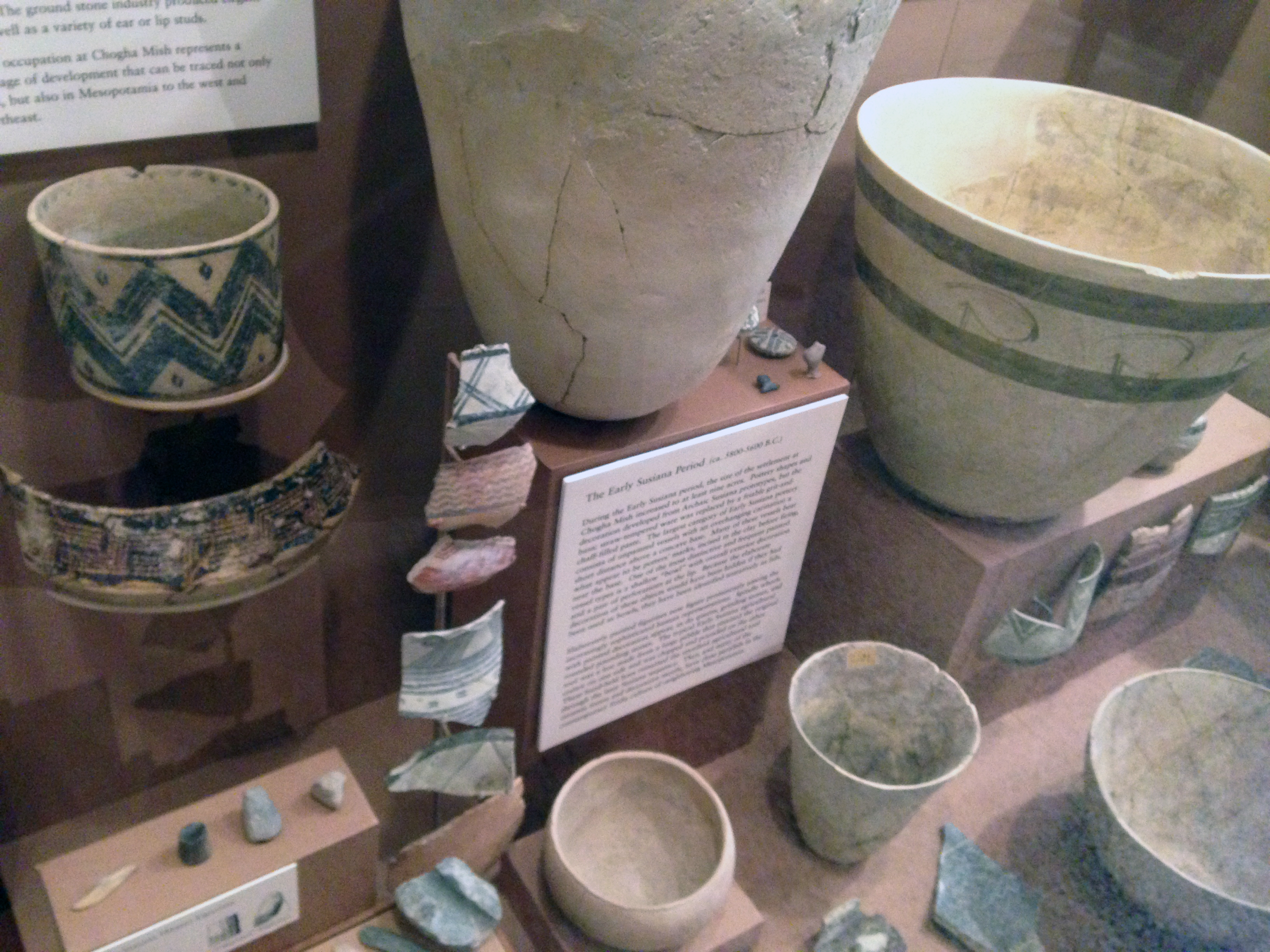
Early Susiana period

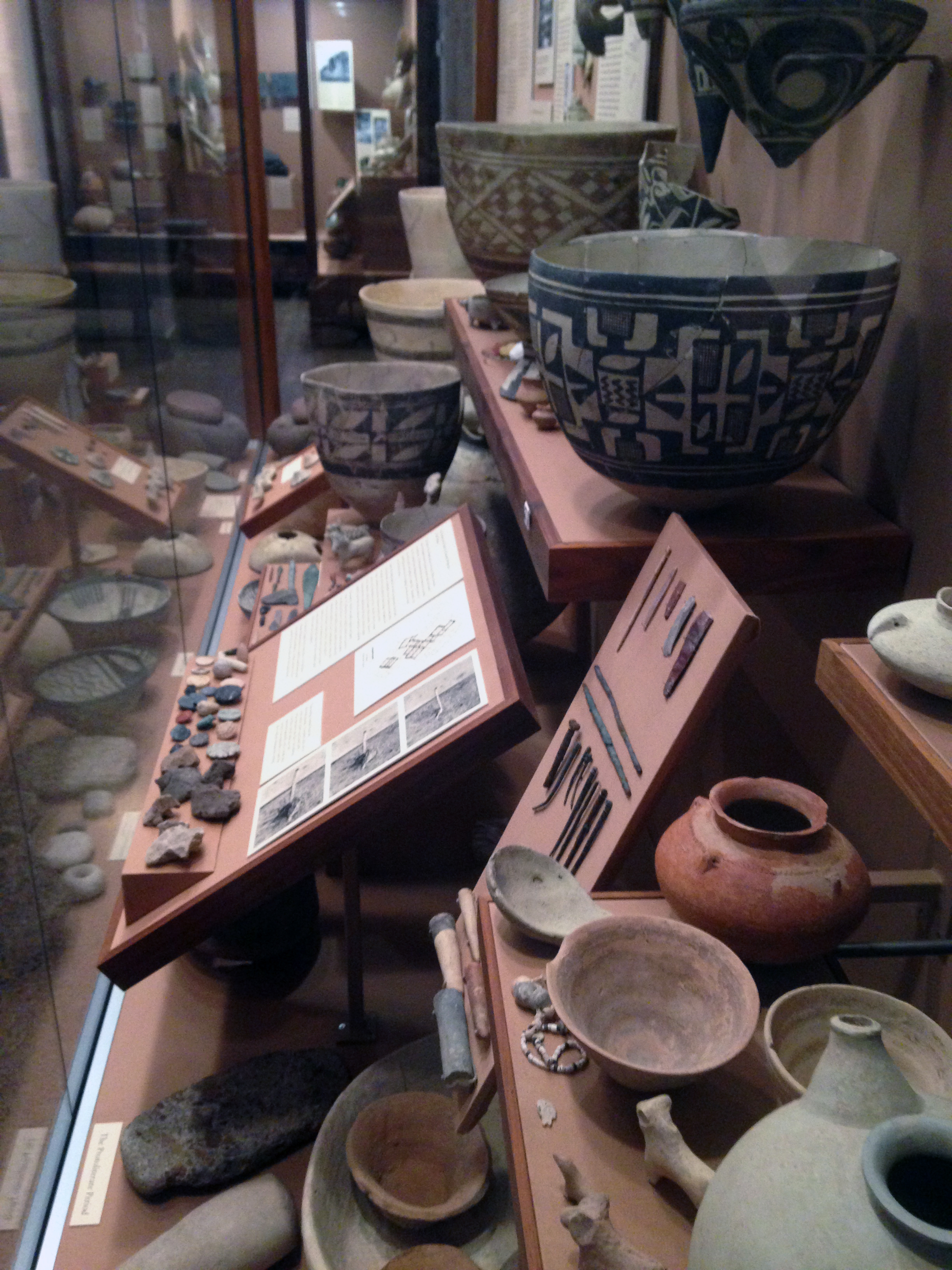

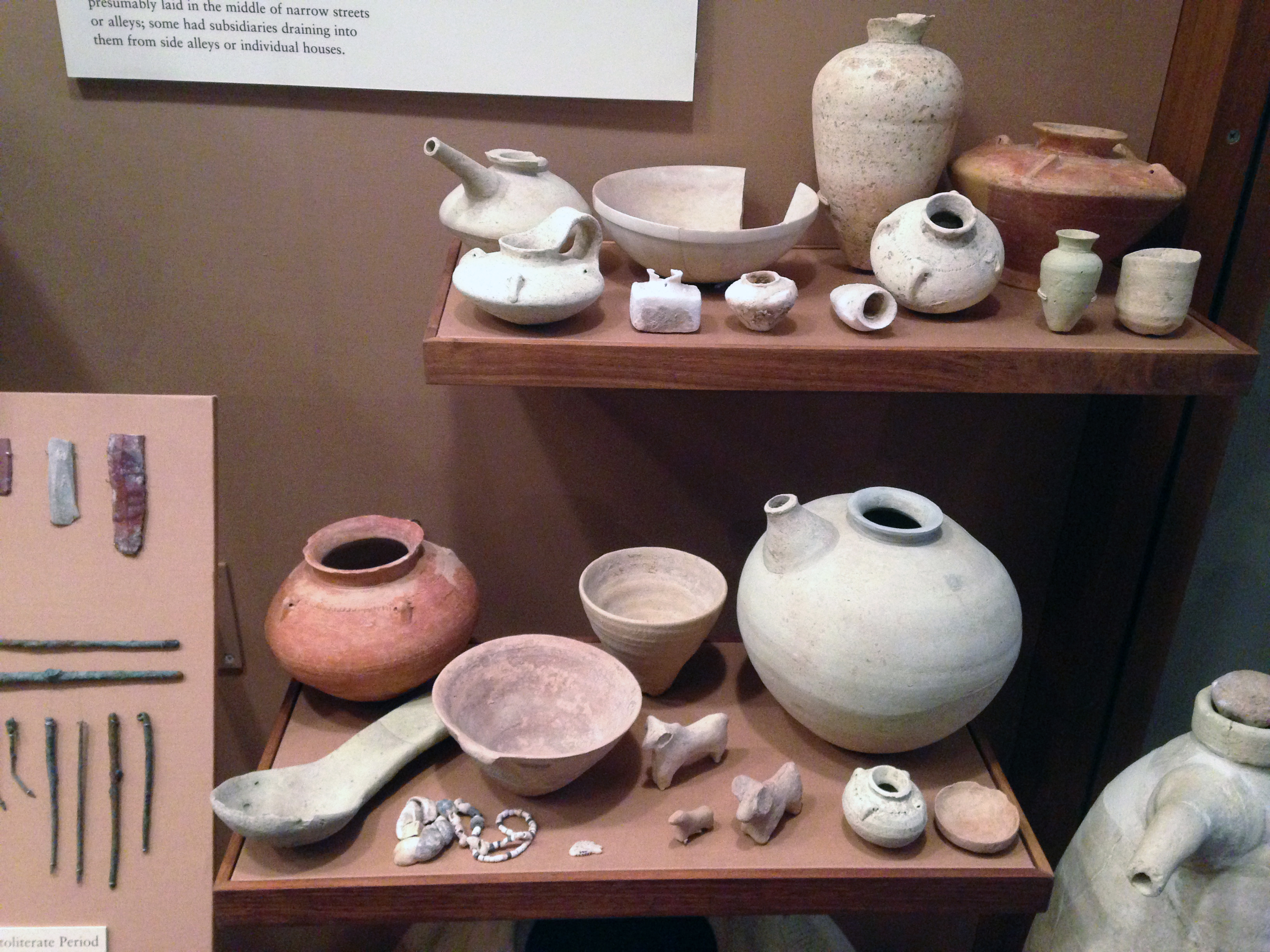

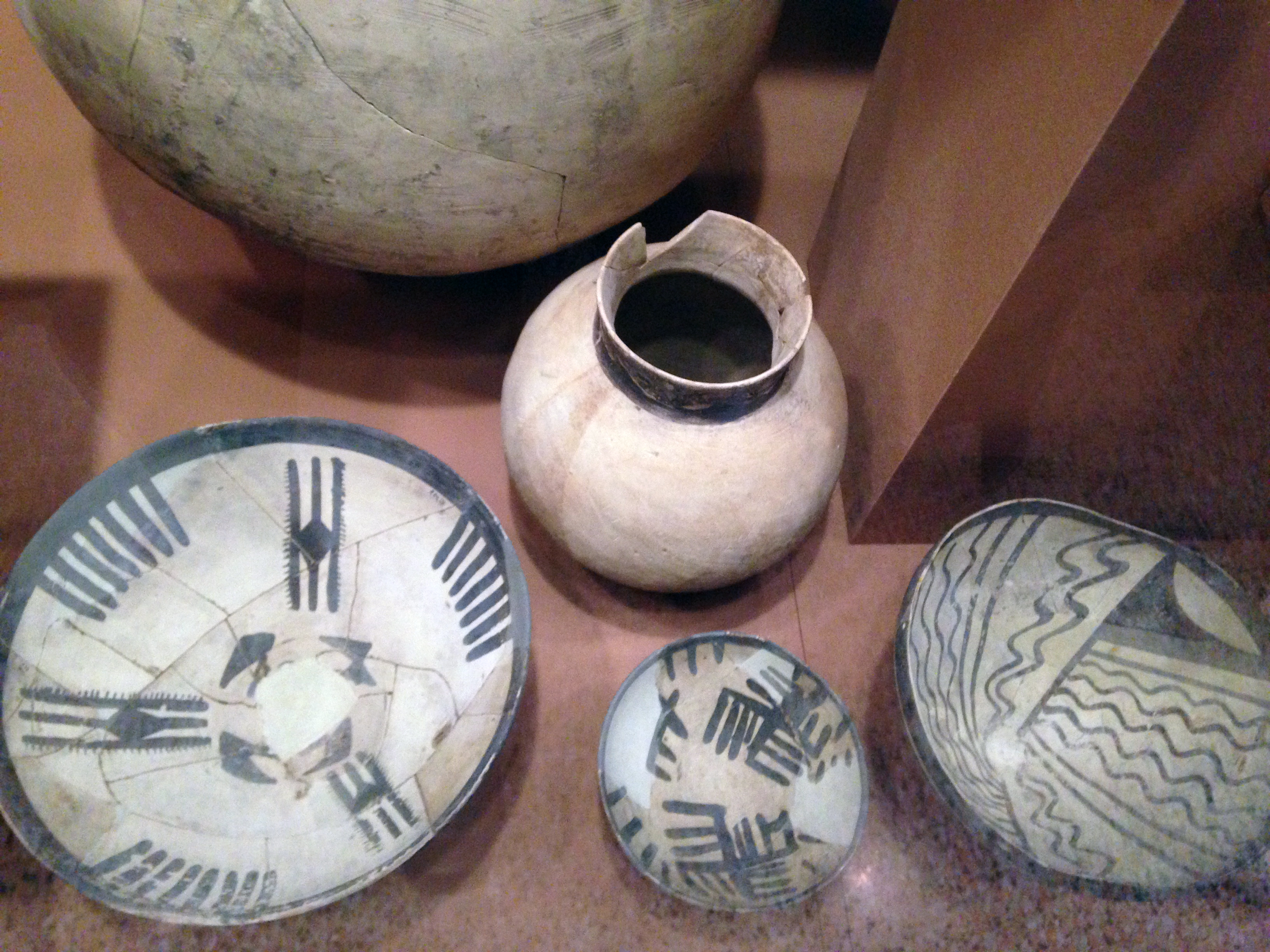

== See also ==
- Cities of the ancient Near East
- Proto-cuneiform
- Proto-Elamite
- Tall-i Bakun
- Early and simple domes
