= Shoush Castle =

Iranian national heritage site

- Château de Suse
- Khuzestan province Near Susa in Iran
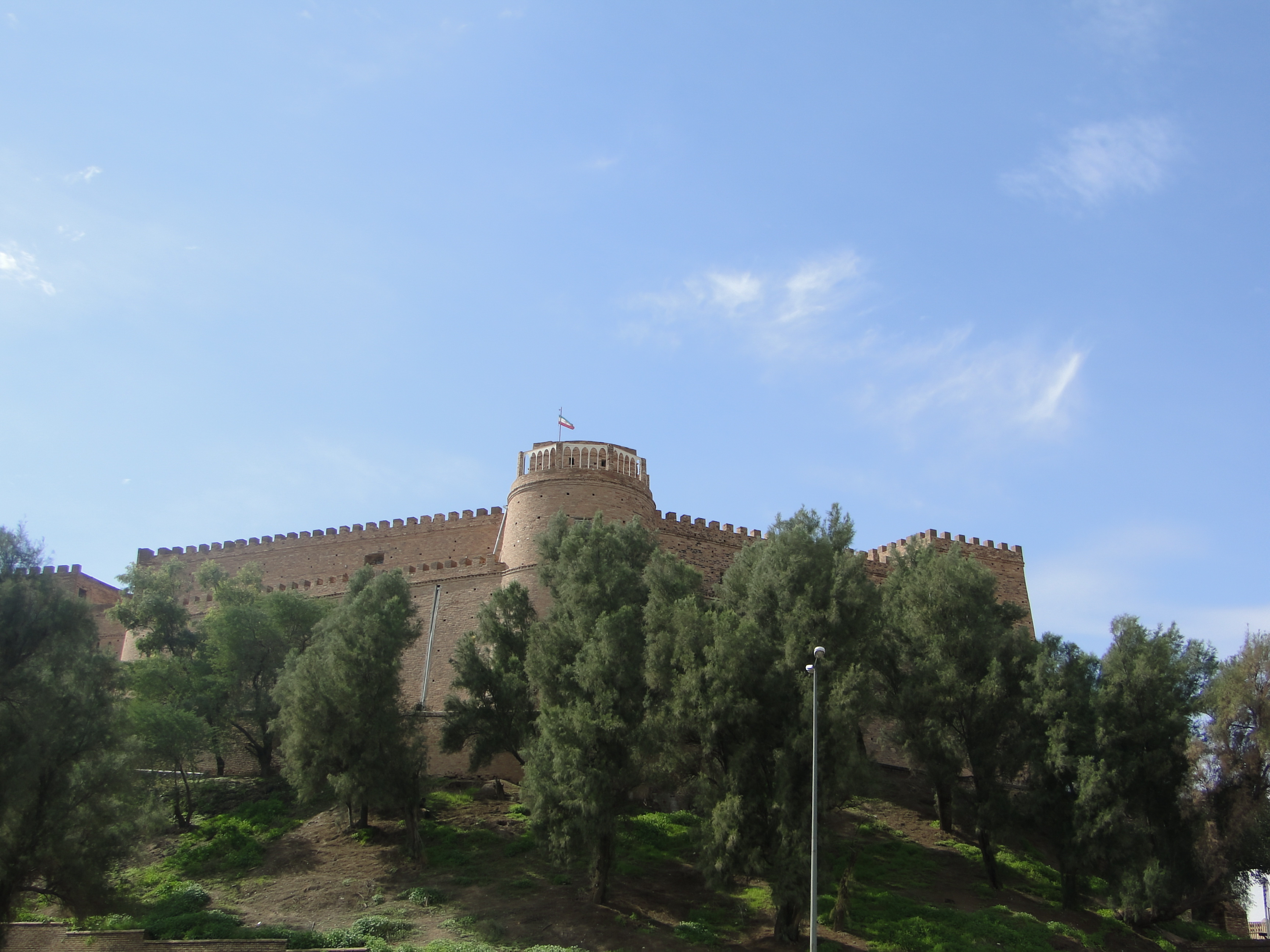
- View Of Shoush Castle

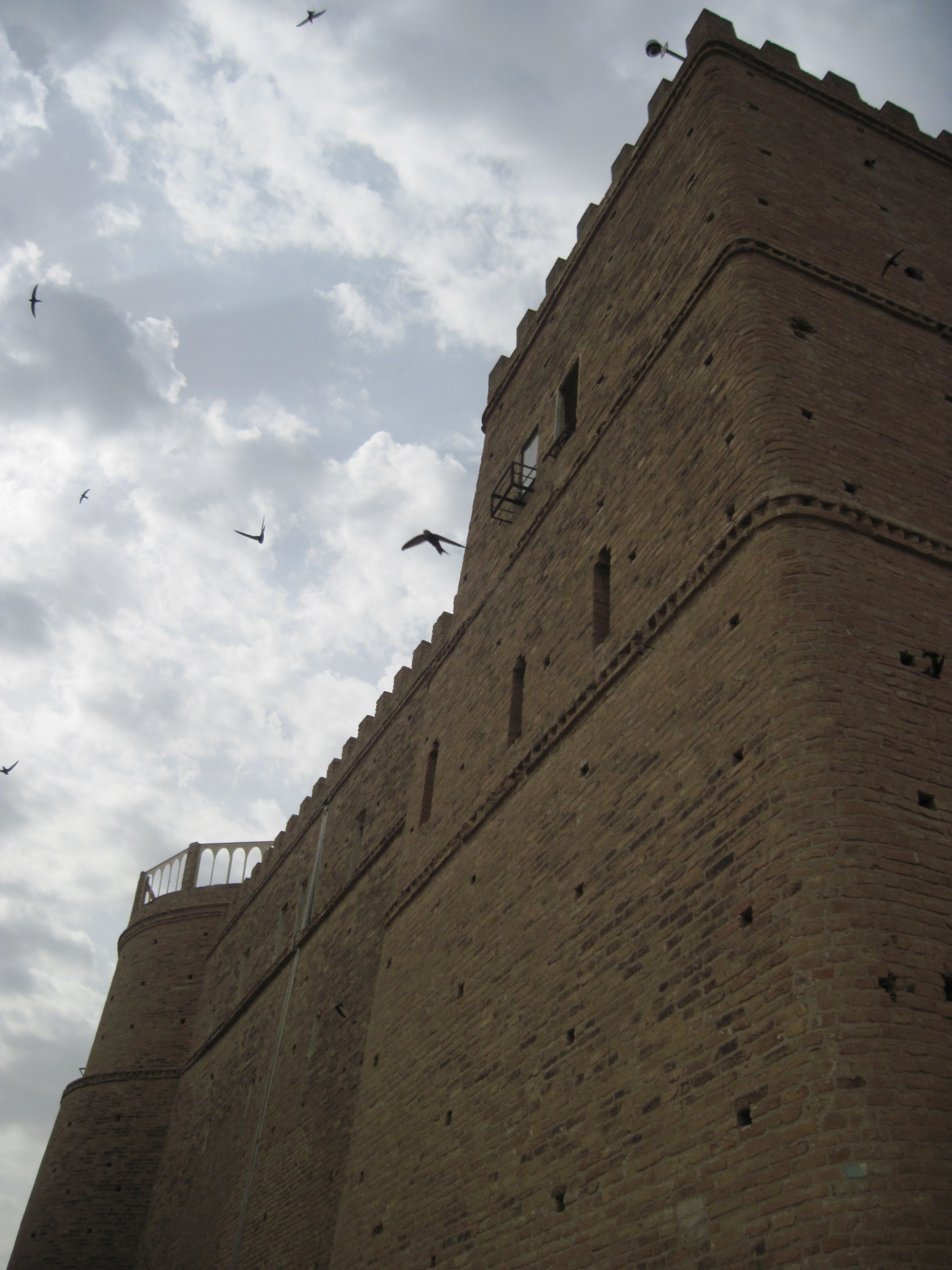

Site information
- Type: Castle
- Operator: Islamic Republic

Location
- Location within Iran
- Coordinates: 32.1903°N 48.2467°E

Site history
- Built: Late 1890s
- Built by: Jean-Marie Jacques de Morgan
- Materials: Bricks

Shoush Castle (Persian: قلعه شوش, romanized: Qal'eh-Shush; French: Château de Suse) is located in the ruins of the ancient city of Susa (in the Shoush) in the Khuzestan province of Iran. The structure stands on a hill overlooking the archaeological site and was historically used as a base of operations for European archaeological missions working in the region. Today, the castle remains one of the most recognizable landmarks within the archaeological complex of Susa.

The castle was constructed in the late 1890s by the French archaeologist Jean-Marie Jacques de Morgan, who directed several French archaeological expeditions in Iran. Built primarily from bricks taken from nearby ancient ruins, the fortress-like structure served as a secure headquarters for the storage of artifacts, excavation equipment, and records collected during the archaeological work carried out at the site. Its design was inspired by medieval European castles, giving it a distinctive appearance that contrasts with the surrounding ancient Mesopotamian ruins.

Shoush Castle is often seen as an example of the early, pre-scientific era of archaeology, when excavation methods were less careful and preservation standards were limited. During this time, archaeologists sometimes removed building materials or damaged parts of ancient sites while searching for artifacts and inscriptions. Bricks from the ruins of Susa were used to construct the castle, which is often cited as an example of these early practices.

Originally administered by the French archaeological mission and considered property of the French government, the castle remained under French control for several decades. Following the Iranian revolution in 1979 and the establishment of the Islamic Republic, the castle was seized by Iranian authorities. The castle was then incorporated into the national heritage system and adapted for public use.

Today, Shoush Castle functions as a museum and cultural site associated with the archaeological area of Susa. It houses exhibits related to the history of the excavations and the ancient city itself.

The castle was heavily damaged by Iraqi bombs during the Iran–Iraq War, but has since been restored.

== Gallery ==
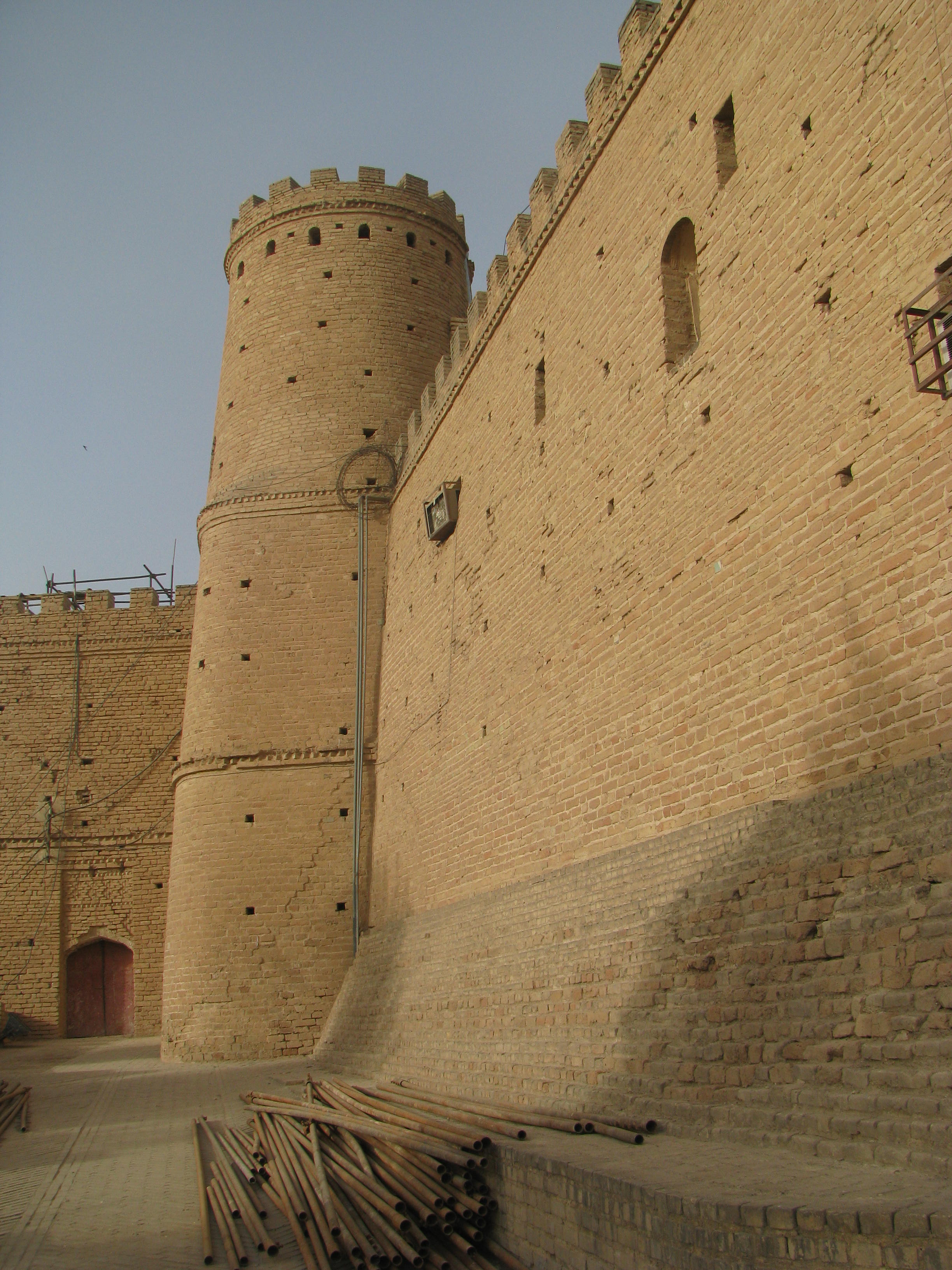

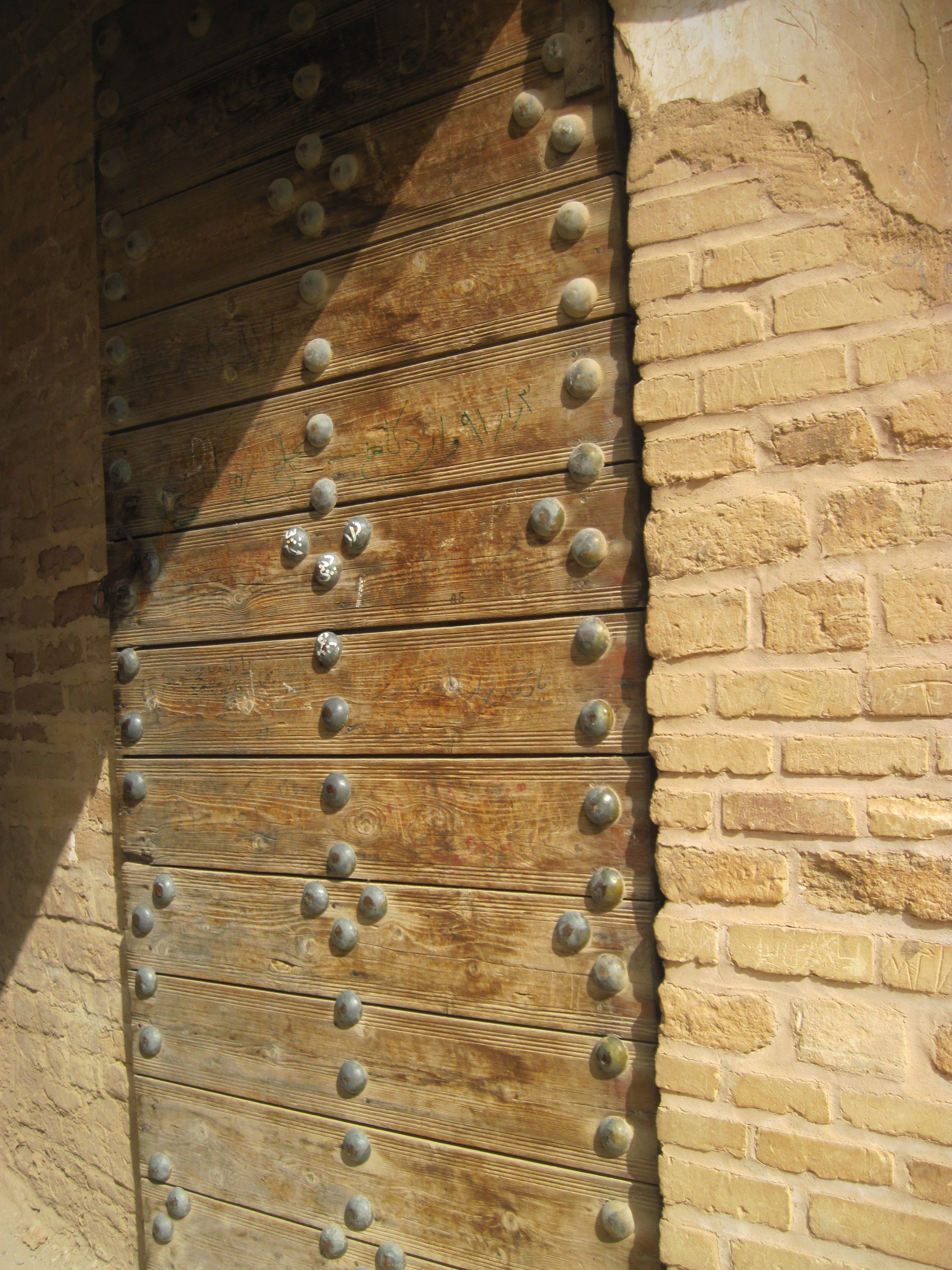

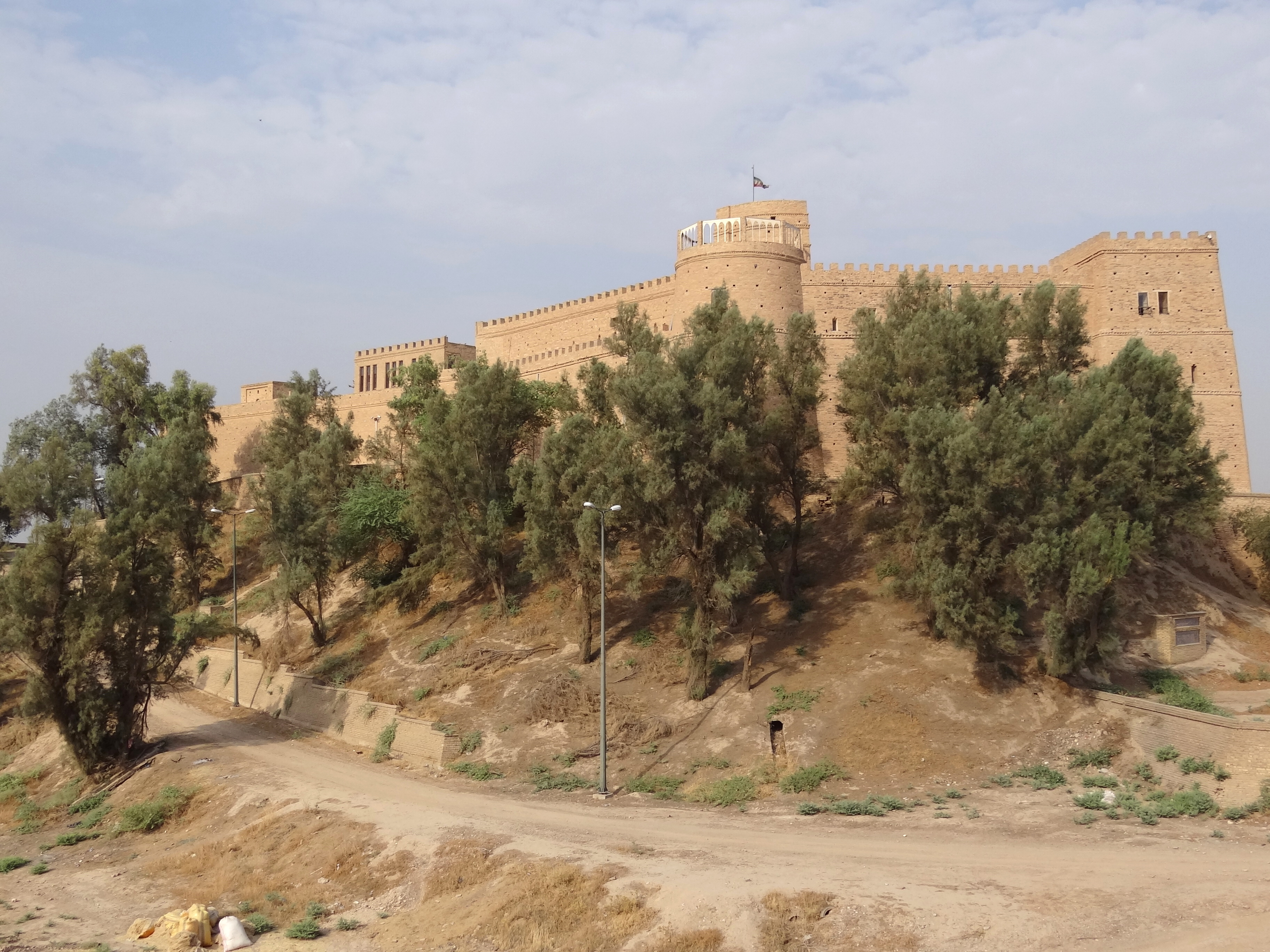

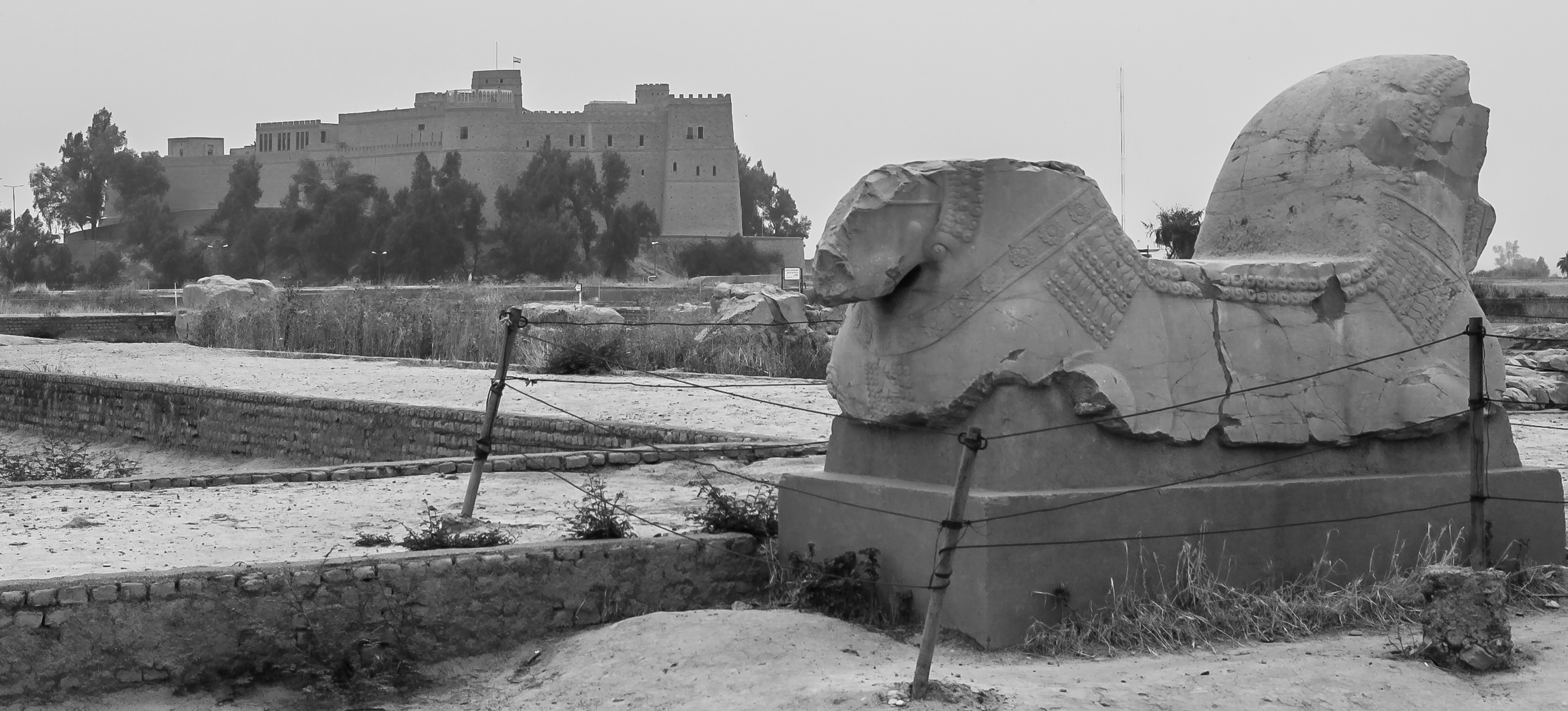

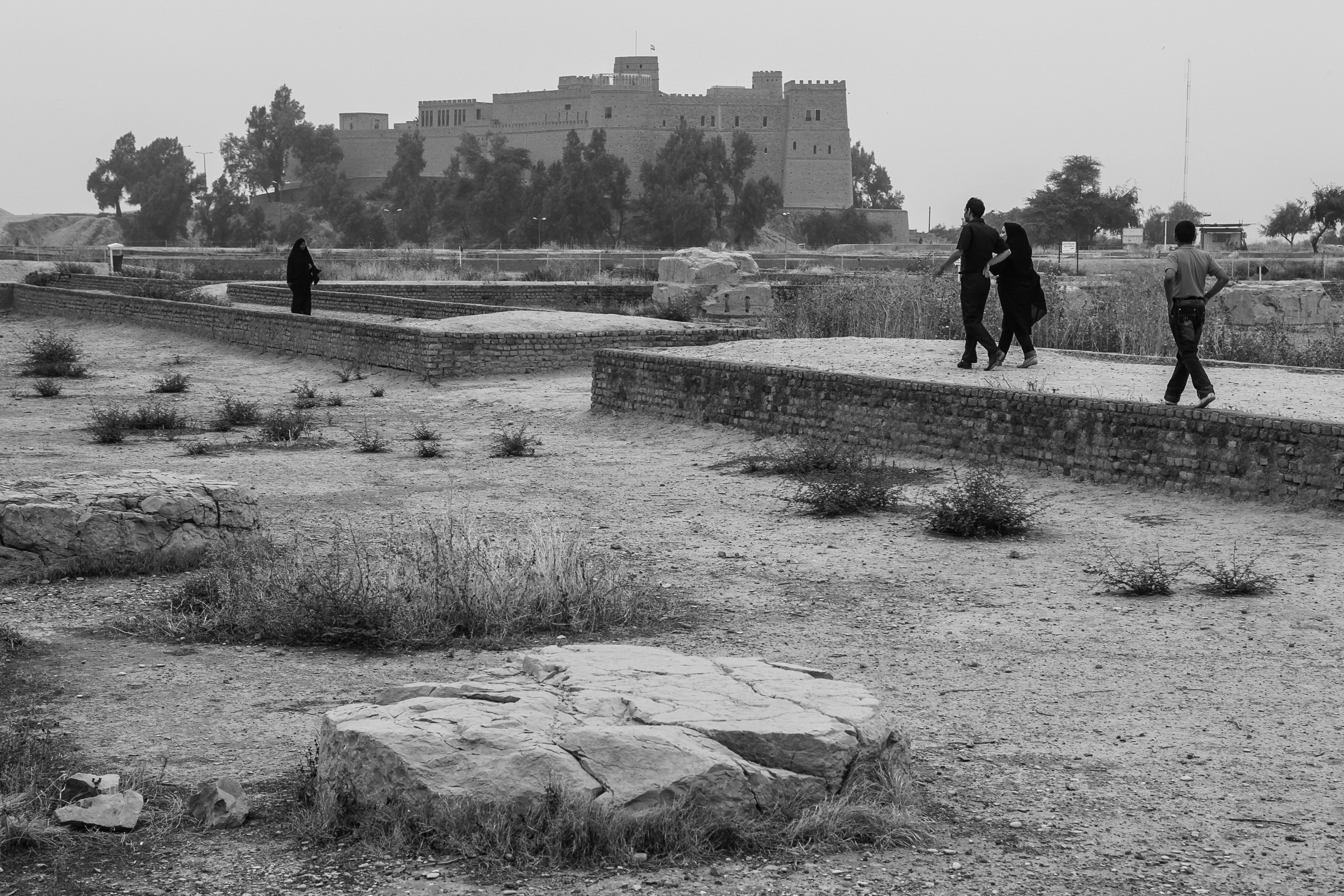

== See also ==
- Shoush
- Khuzestan
- Iranian architecture
