= Tappeh Sangar =

- Location in Iran
- Coordinates: 38°50′39″N 47°01′25″E
- Country: Iran
- Province: East Azerbaijan Province
- Time zone: UTC+3:30 (IRST)
  - Summer (DST): UTC+4:30 (IRDT)

Tappeh Sangar is a village in the East Azerbaijan Province of Iran.
