= Ai-Toghdï =

Ruler of Khuzestan from c. 1155 to 1174/5

Ai-Toghdï, also known as Shumla (شملة; died 1174/5) was the ruler of Khuzestan from c. 1155 until his death.

Shumla was a member of the Afshar tribe of the Oghuz Turks. In the mid-1150s he took advantage of the decline of the Seljuks and established his rule over Khuzestan. His authority was at first contested by the Seljuk prince Malik-Shah ibn Mahmud, who seized part of Khuzestan between 1158 and 1161, but Shumla was eventually able to restore his authority over the entire province.

During his reign Shumla frequently dealt with his neighbors. Besides being active in Seljuk affairs, he invaded the Abbasid Caliphate in 1167 and 1173/4 in an attempt to gain territory in Iraq, but was expelled both times by the caliph's forces. He also invaded and temporarily occupied Fars in 1169 after the discontented army of the Salghurid amir Muzaffar al-Din Zangi invited him to do so.

Upon his death in 1174 or 1175, one of Shumla's sons succeeded him in Khuzestan. This son ruled until his death in 1195; after he died the caliph Al-Nasir's vizier Mu'ayyaid al-Din Ibn Qassib invaded. He annexed the province and sent Shumla's grandsons to Baghdad. Khuzestan remained in the hands of the Abbasids until the Mongol invasion of 1258.
