= Kadınhanı =

- District and municipality
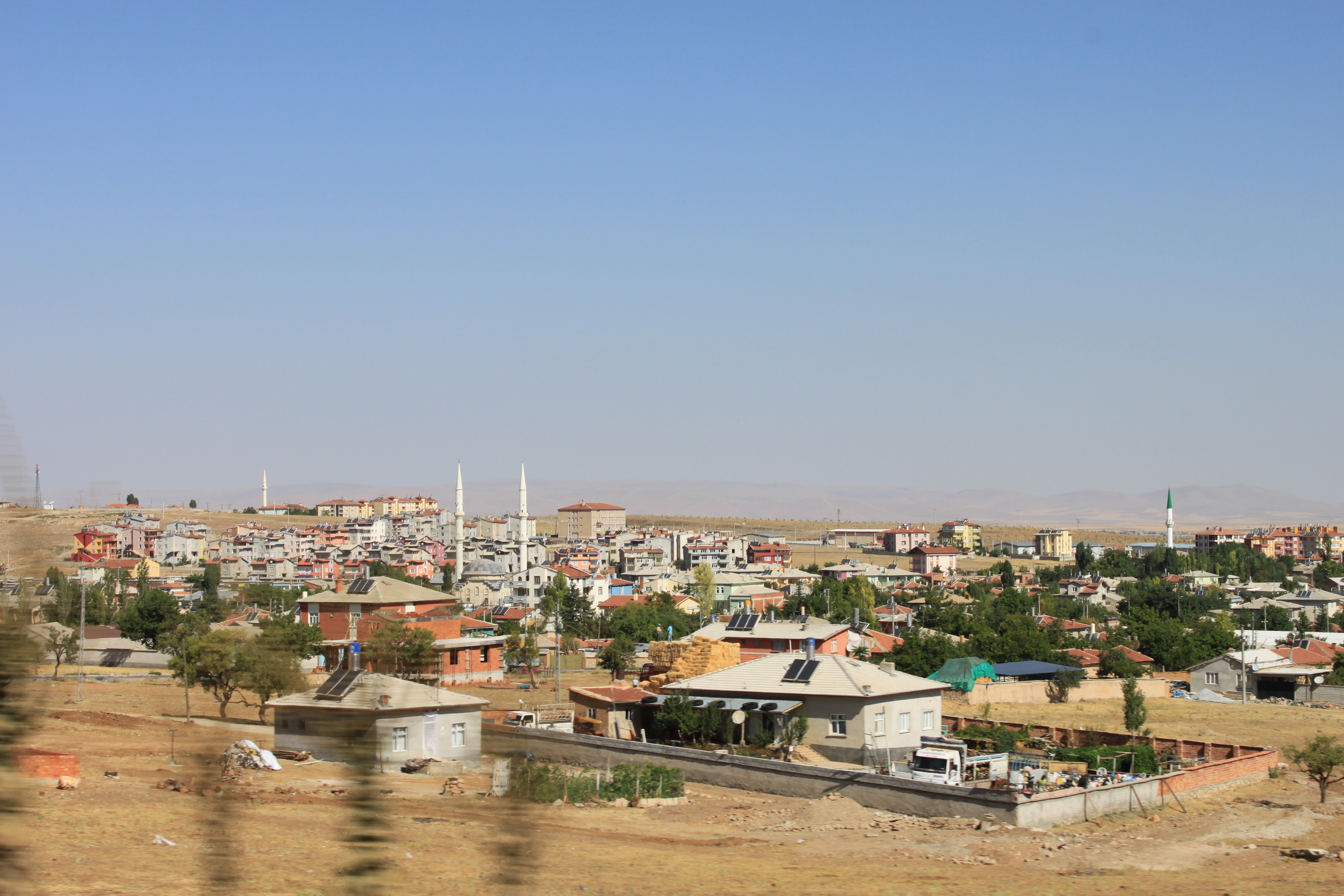

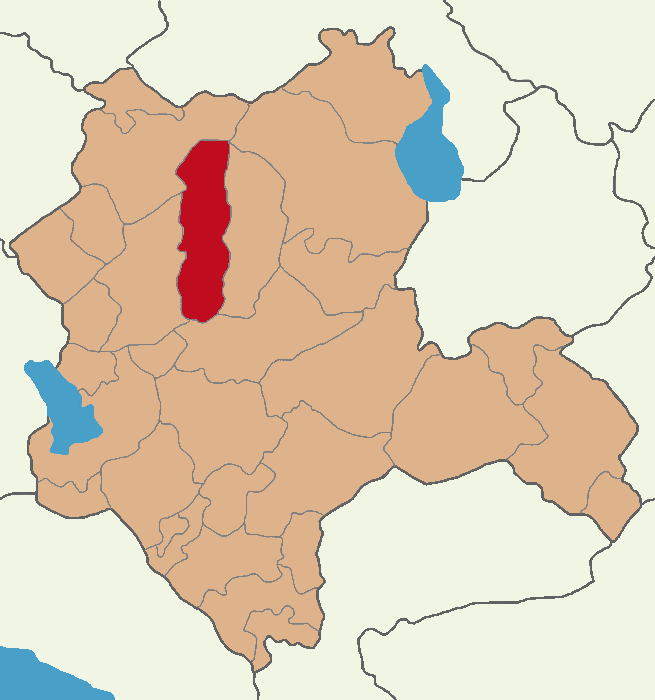
- Map showing Kadınhanı District in Konya Province

- Location within Turkey Location within Turkey Central Anatolia
- Coordinates: 38°14′23″N 32°12′41″E
- Country: Turkey
- Province: Konya
- Area: 1,568 km^{2} (605 sq mi)
- Elevation: 1,126 m (3,694 ft)
- Population (2022): 31,206
  - Density: 19.90/km^{2} (51.55/sq mi)
- Time zone: UTC+3 (TRT)
- Postal code: 42800
- Area code: 0332
- Website: www.kadinhani.bel.tr

Kadınhanı is a municipality and district of Konya Province, Turkey. Its area is 1,568 km^{2}, and its population is 31,206 (2022). Its elevation is 1,126 m (3,694 ft). The current name of the town ("han of the woman") refers to a certain female commissioner of a caravanserai in the town, whereas the town was known historically by its Greek name of Pithoi.

== Composition ==
There are 52 neighbourhoods in Kadınhanı District:

- Afşarlı
- Alabağ
- Atlantı
- Bakırpınar
- Başkuyu
- Bayramlı
- Beykavağı
- Bulgurpınarı
- Çavdar
- Çeşmecik
- Çubuk
- Demiroluk
- Doğanlar
- Güngören
- Hacımehmetli
- Hacıoflazlar
- Hacıpirli
- İstiklal
- Kabacalı
- Kamışlıözü
- Karahisarlı
- Karakaya
- Karakurtlu
- Karasevinç
- Karayürüklü
- Kayabaşı
- Kızılkuyu
- Kökez
- Kolukısa
- Konurören
- Köylütolu
- Küçükkuyu
- Kurthasanlı
- Mahmudiye
- Meydanlı
- Örnekköy
- Osmancık
- Pınarbaşı
- Pirali
- Pusat
- Saçıkara
- Şahören
- Sarıkaya
- Söğütözü
- Tepebaşı
- Tosunoğlu
- Turgutlu
- Ünveren
- Yağlıca
- Yaylayaka
- Yeni
- Zafer
