= Bozulus =

Turcoman tribal confederation

Bozulus, also spelled Boz-ulus or Boz Ulus (lit. 'grey nation' in Turkish), is the name given by the Ottomans to a tribal nomadic confederation of predominantly Turcoman tribes that were located in the vicinity of Diyarbakır. These tribes were brought into the Ottoman Empire following the victory of sultan Selim I over the Safavids at the Battle of Chaldiran, as well as subsequent Ottoman campaigns in eastern Anatolia. By the 1520s, if not earlier, the Ottomans had established the Bozulus confederacy. Most of the tribes in the Bozulus stemmed from the Aq Qoyunlu confederacy.

In the first half of 17th century, the confederacy gradually dissolved, as a result of the political unrest and the insecurity caused by Iranian military incursions, which resulted with some groups breaking away from the main body and going to western Anatolia.

== History ==
=== Etymology ===
The word boz is found in almost all of the Turkic languages, and appears in Middle Mongol as boro. Boz has two meanings, first "to break" and second "gray", specifically a color "between white and roan", light gray, ash-colored, light-ashen, whitish, off-white, skewbald, blue tending towards white, blue-gray, whitish red, etc. Its symbolic significance is not clear. Boz is used as color symbolism, in connection with a later Oghuz nomadic subdivisions such as Boz Oq or Boz Ulus.

The Boz Ulus Kanunnamesi enacted in 1540 recognizes ethnic and social differences of the Muslim communities under the Ottoman rule, which characterizes the Turkmen nomadic tribes as Boz Ulus (grey nation) and the Kurdish nomadic tribes as Kara Ulus (black nation).

=== Population ===
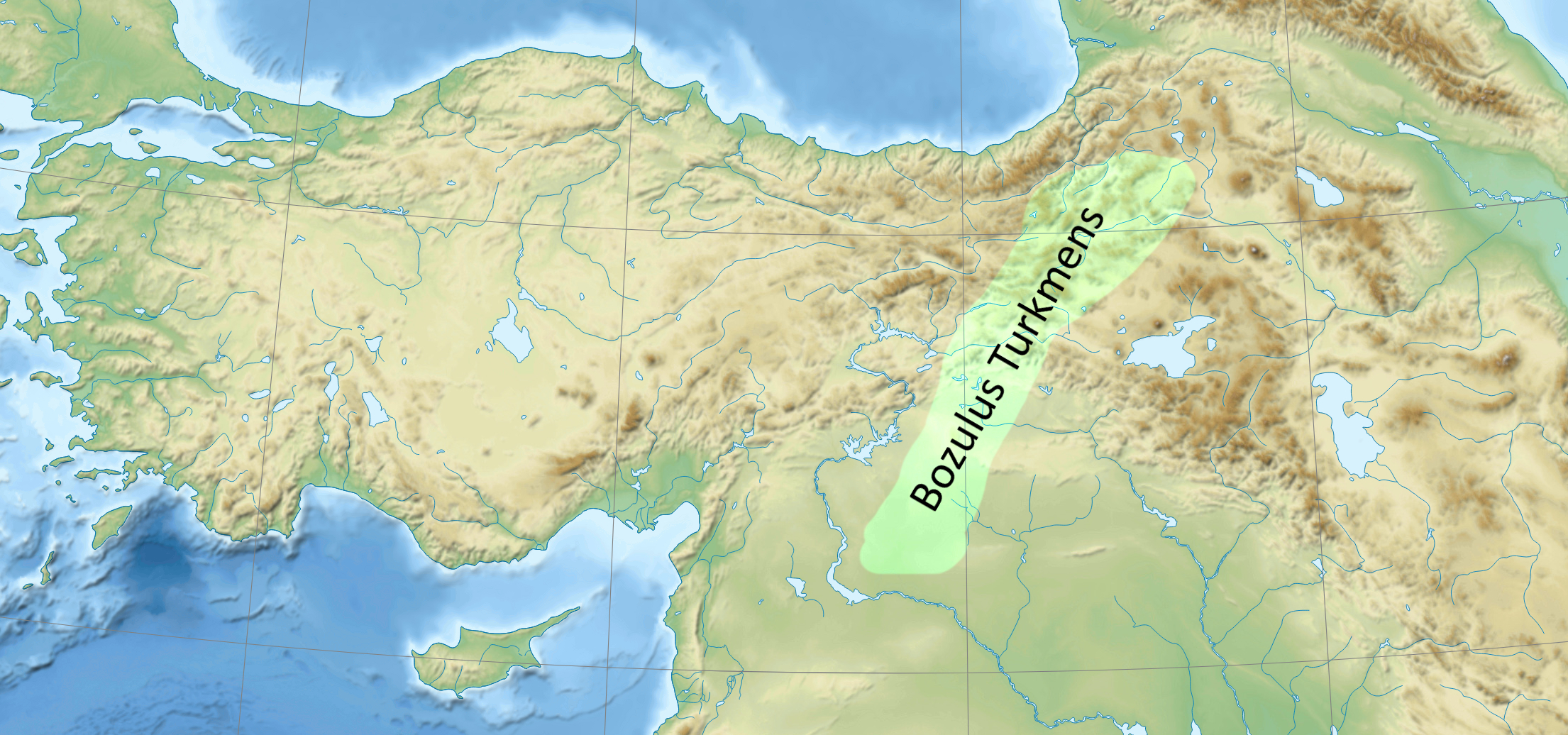
Distribution of Bozulus Turkmens in the 16th century

In c. 1474, the confederacy had 6,000 households (tents) with 29,000 persons, including 3,000 men, 15,000 women and 11,000 children. According to the Ottoman census dating 1540, the confederacy consisted of 4,994 households, which 4,568 were families, while 462 were mücerred (bachelors). Turkologist Mustafaev believes that the confederation was large as 23,000 people. Population of Bozulus in the 17th century is estimated to 60,000 people with more than 2 million sheep. Its seasonal migrations covered an area extending from Mardin to Persia and Georgia.

In early 17th century some groups broke off from this confederacy went to western Anatolia and the Balkans, signaling the end of the confederacy in eastern Anatolia. The confederacy started to come to the Karaman and Ankara regions and reached to the Kütahya and Aydın regions by the middle of the 17th century. A community of Bozulus had been settled in Kuşadası whereas some groups had been settled within the Aegean islands like Rhodes and Kos (İstanköy).
