= Kamnaskires II Nikephoros =

King of Elymais from c.147 BC to 139 BC

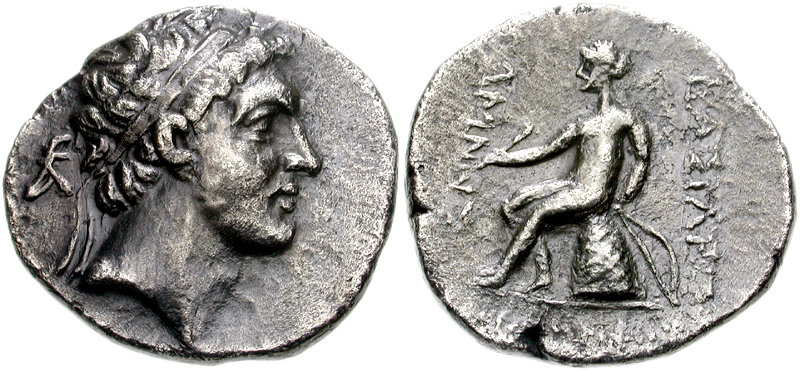
- Coin of Kamnaskires II Nikephoros

King of Elymais
- Reign: 147–139 BC
- Predecessor: Kamnaskires I Megas Soter
- Successor: Okkonapses
- Died: 139 BC
- Dynasty: Kamnaskirid

Kamnaskires II, surnamed Nikephoros ("the Bringer of Victory") was a king of the Elymais only known from his coins. He reigned from about 147 to 139 BC. Around 150 BC, the Seleucid Empire disintegrated and at several places local governors became independent and assumed the title of "king" (basileus). The first king in the Elymais was Kamnaskires Soter ("the Saviour"), who ruled around 147 BC. Kamnaskires II Nikephoros ruled slightly later and it is possible that he was identical with Kamnaskires Soter, just changing his name. In 140 BC, Kamnaskires II accepted Parthian suzerainty. However, not long after, Kamnaskires II aided the Seleucid ruler Demetrius II Nicator against the Parthian monarch Mithridates I (r. 171–132 BC). However, Demetrius was eventually defeated and captured by the Parthians. Mithridates I then punished Elymais for aiding the Seleucids–he invaded the region once more and captured two of their major cities.

The coins of Kamnaskires II Nikephoros are fully Hellenistic in style. They show the portrait of a young man. The reverse shows most often a young god. Less common are an anchor, a cornucopia, an eagle, a bow with quiver or a Nike.

== Sources ==
- Hansman, John F. (1998). "Elymais". Encyclopaedia Iranica, Vol. VIII, Fasc. 4. pp. 373–376.
- Kawami, Trudy S. (2013). "Parthian and Elymaean Rock Reliefs". In Potts, Daniel T. (ed.). The Oxford Handbook of Ancient Iran. Oxford University Press. ISBN 978-0199733309.
- Rezakhani, Khodadad (2013). "Arsacid, Elymaean, and Persid Coinage". In Potts, Daniel T. (ed.). The Oxford Handbook of Ancient Iran. Oxford University Press. ISBN 978-0199733309.
- Schippmann, K. (1986). "Arsacids ii. The Arsacid dynasty". Encyclopaedia Iranica, Vol. II, Fasc. 5. pp. 525–536.
- Shayegan, M. Rahim (2011). Arsacids and Sasanians: Political Ideology in Post-Hellenistic and Late Antique Persia. Cambridge University Press. pp. 1–539. ISBN 9780521766418.
- van't Haaff, Pieter Anne (2007). Catalogue of Elymaean Coinage: Ca. 147 B.C.-A.D. 228. Lancaster: Classical Numismatic Group. ISBN 978-0-9709268-8-3.

Preceded by Kamnaskires I Megas Soter	King of Elymais; 147–139 BC	Succeeded by Okkonapses
