= Parthian campaign of Antiochus VII =

Campaign fought between Seleucids and Parthians

Coordinates: 34.7961°N 48.5158°E

The Parthian campaign of Antiochus VII, king of the Seleucid Empire, was an offensive to restore Seleucid rule in Mesopotamia and Persia. Antiochus led a large army to retake territories and quickly won three victories against the Parthians, capturing Babylonia and Media. By the spring of 129 BC, however, the conquered cities had risen in revolt against his garrisons. Marching to their relief, Antiochus led his army through the Zagros Mountains, where it was ambushed by the Parthian king Phraates II. Surrounded by the enemy, Antiochus was either killed in battle or took his own life. After his death, the territory of the Seleucids was limited to the area of Syria.

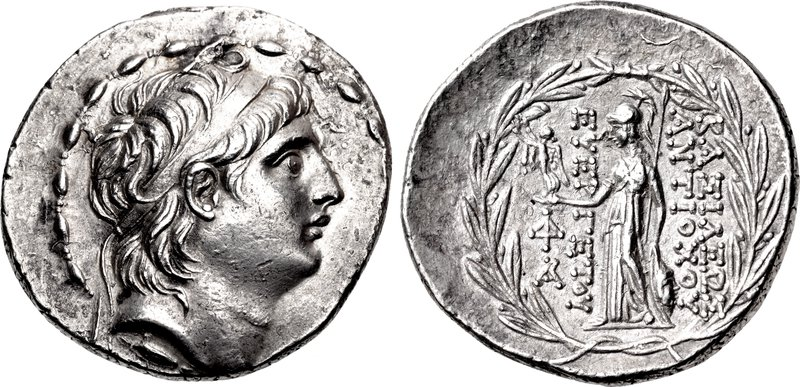
King Antiochus VII

== Conquest of Babylonia and Media ==
By 134 BCE, Parthian King Mithridates I had conquered the territories of Media, Babylonia, Elymais, and Characene, all previously ruled by the Seleucid Empire. After Mithridates's death in 132 BCE, Seleucid King Antiochus VII amassed a large force of Greek mercenaries, totaling 80,000 soldiers, to restore Seleucid rule over western Asia. By late 130 BCE, Antiochus defeated the Parthian general Indates along the Great Zab. To celebrate his victory, Antiochus built a tropaion, near the bank of the river Lycus. An uprising in Seleucia resulted in the death of the Parthian commander Enius, while Susa also came under Seleucid control as Antiochus advanced eastward.

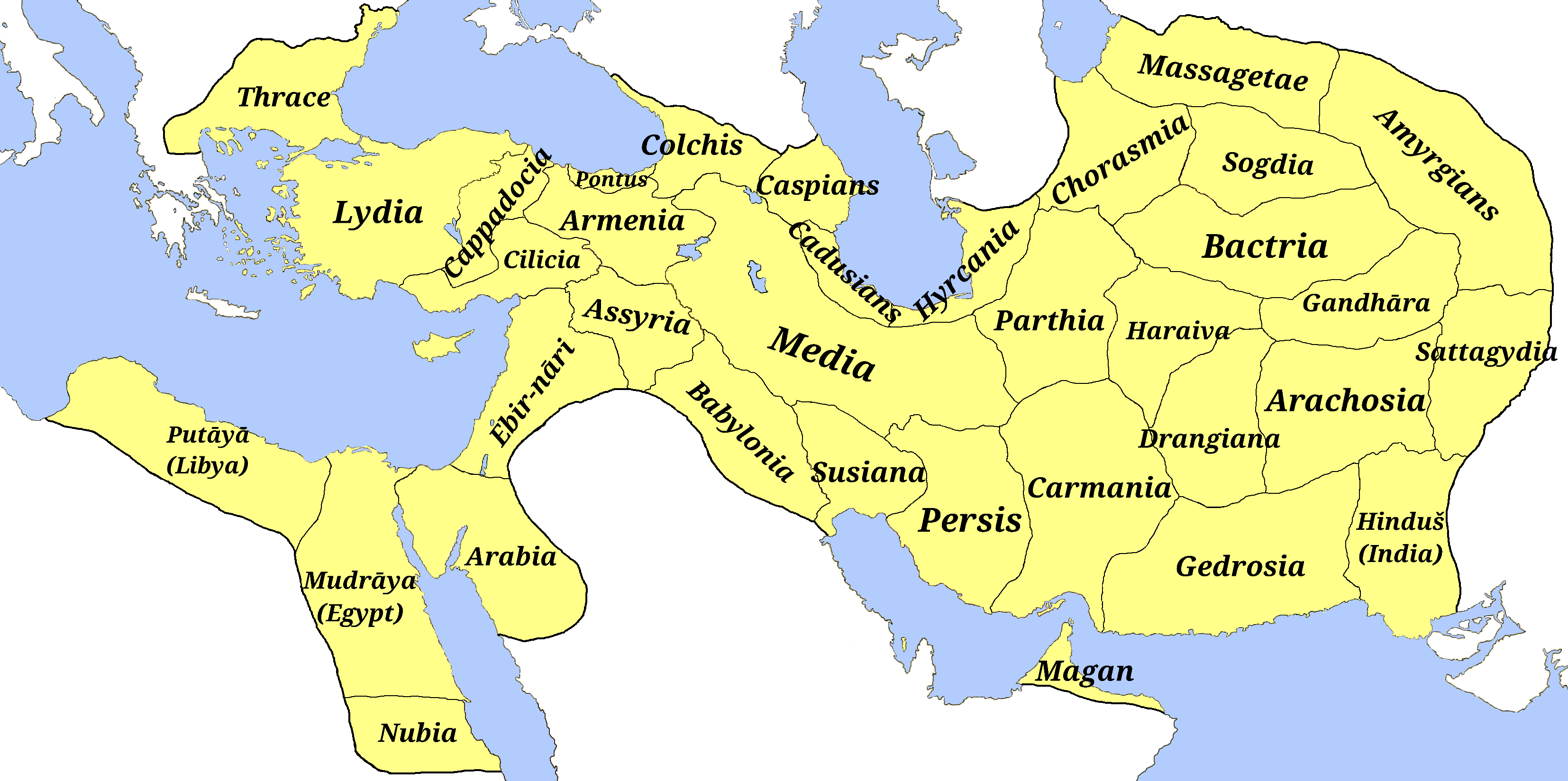
Antiochus conquered Babylonia and Media.

Antiochus conquered Babylonia and Media, and for winter, divided his army into garrisons and quartered most of his army in Babylonia or Media. (Note: Stuart Brown states Antiochus's campaign stopped short of Ecbatana.) (Note: "One extensive study of the Parthian campaign of Antiochus argues that he went as far as the homeland of the Parthians and it was there that he wintered and then lost his life in the early spring of 129 B.C. This is unlikely, since Ecbatana is neither mentioned in any source, nor were any coins of Demetrius or Antiochus VII struck there, which seems odd if the latter actually wintered in the homeland of the Parthians.") (Note: Nikolaus Overtoom says Antiochus's winter quarters may have been in Ecbatana.) (Note: William Tarn states Antiochus wintered his troops in Ecbatana.)

Following Antiochus's victories against the Parthians, Phraates II, who had succeeded Mithridates I, sent envoys to Antiochus to negotiate peace. Antiochus refused unless the Parthians relinquished all lands to him except Parthia proper, paid heavy tribute, and released his brother Demetrius II from captivity. Phraates released Demetrius, (Note: Richard Frye states it is not possible to determine when Demetrius was released.) (Note: Nikolaus Overtoom states Phraates released Demetrius before Antiochus's campaign began) but ignored the other demands.

== Revolt ==
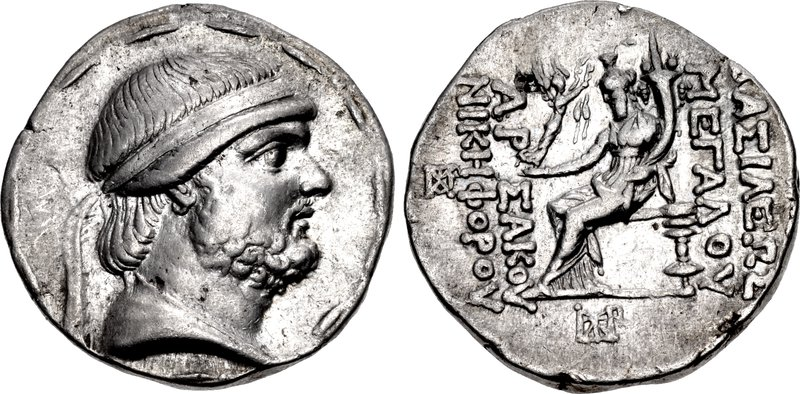
King Phraates II

By October/November 129 BCE, the cities that Antiochus had conquered were in revolt. (Note: David Bivar states that the cities in revolt were in Media) (Note: Nikolaus Overtoom states that the cities in revolt were in Babylonia.) In response, Antiochus marched through the Zagros Mountains to relieve his garrisons, but his army was ambushed by the Parthian king Phraates II. (Note: "Moses Khorenats'i recounts that the final confrontation between Phraates II and Antiochus Sidetes took place in wintertime, near Babylon.") Antiochus' commanders recommended that he withdraw to the protection of the mountain slopes. He instead chose to engage the Parthians and was subjected to hit and run tactics that hemmed in the Seleucids. By this point, the Seleucid troops started retreating, causing some of Antiochus's generals like Athenaeus of Macedonia to flee. As the battle deteriorated for the Seleucids, Antiochus and a select group of cavalry charged the Parthians and became isolated from the main army. The Parthians attacked Antiochus's group en masse and Antiochus was either killed or committed suicide to avoid capture.

== Sources ==
- Bing, J. Daniel; Sievers, Joseph (1986). "Antiochus". Encyclopaedia Iranica.
- Bivar, A.D.H. (1983). "The Political History of Iran Under the Arsacids". In Yarshater, Ehsan (ed.). The Cambridge History of Iran: The Seleucid, Parthian and Sasanian Periods. Vol. 3(1). Cambridge: Cambridge University Press. pp. 21–99. ISBN 0-521-20092-X.
- Brown, Stuart C. (1997). "ECBATANA". Encyclopaedia Iranica.
- Frye, Richard Nelson (1984). The History of Ancient Iran. C.H. Beck'sche Verlagsbuchhandlung. p. 212. ISBN 9783406093975.
- Kosmin, Paul J. (2014). The Land of the Elephant Kings: Space, Territory, and Ideology in the Seleucid Empire. Harvard University Press. ISBN 9780674416178.
- Overtoom, Nikolaus Leo (2020). Reign of Arrows: The Rise of the Parthian Empire in the Hellenistic Middle East. Oxford University Press. ISBN 9780190888336.
- Sampson, Gareth C. (2008). The Defeat of Rome in the East: Crassus, the Parthians, and the Disastrous Battle of Carrhae, 53 BC. Casemate. ISBN 9781932033892.
- Shayegan, M. Rahim (2011). Arsacids and Sasanians: Political Ideology in Post-Hellenistic and Late Antique Persia. Cambridge University Press. ISBN 9780521766418.
- Tarn, W.W. (1966). "Parthia". In Cook, S.A.; Adcock, F.E.; Charlesworth, M.P. (eds.). The Cambridge Ancient History Volume. Vol. IX: The Roman Republic, 133-44 B.C. Cambridge at the University Press. pp. 574–613.
