= Orodes IV of Elymais =

2nd-century ruler of Elymais

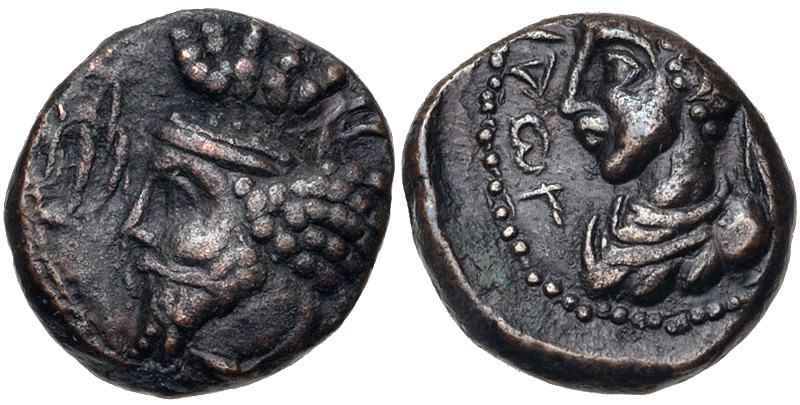
Coin of Orodes IV

Orodes IV of Elymais was the ruler of Elymais in the second half of the 2nd century. He may be the same Orodes mentioned in the inscriptions of the Tang-e Sarvak site.

== Sources ==
- Rezakhani, Khodadad (2013). "Arsacid, Elymaean, and Persid Coinage". In Potts, Daniel T. (ed.). The Oxford Handbook of Ancient Iran. Oxford University Press. ISBN 978-0199733309.
