= Kamnaskires IV =

1st century BC Kamnaskirid king of Elymais

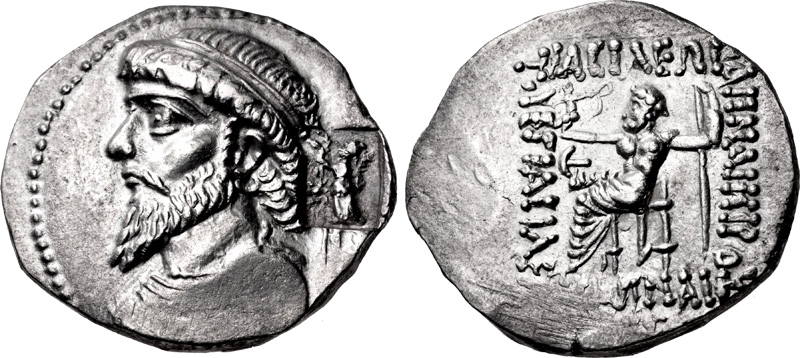
Coin of Kamnaskires IV

Kamnaskires IV was the Kamnaskirid king of Elymais from 62/1 BC (or 59/8) to 56/5 BC.

== Sources ==
- Kia, Mehrdad (2016). The Persian Empire: A Historical Encyclopedia. ABC-CLIO. ISBN 978-1610693912. (2 volumes)
- Hansman, John F. (1998). "Elymais". Encyclopaedia Iranica, Vol. VIII, Fasc. 4. pp. 373–376.
- Rezakhani, Khodadad (2013). "Arsacid, Elymaean, and Persid Coinage". In Potts, Daniel T. (ed.). The Oxford Handbook of Ancient Iran. Oxford University Press. ISBN 978-0199733309.
- Shayegan, M. Rahim (2011). Arsacids and Sasanians: Political Ideology in Post-Hellenistic and Late Antique Persia. Cambridge University Press. pp. 1–539. ISBN 9780521766418.

Preceded by Kamnaskires III	King of Elymais; 62/1 or 59/8 BC–56/5 BC	Succeeded by Kamnaskires V
