= Nicanor of Stageira =

Nicanor (/naɪˈkeɪnər/; Greek: Nικάνωρ Nīkā́nōr) of Stageira in Macedonia, was despatched by Alexander the Great to proclaim at the Olympic Games of 324 BCE the decree for the recall of the exiles throughout the Greek cities.

It is perhaps the same person whom we find at an earlier period entrusted with the command of the fleet during Alexander's siege of Miletus. At least it seems probable that the Nicanor there mentioned is not the son of Parmenion; he may, however, be identical with the Nicanor who was satrap of Media under Antigonus.
