= Orodes I of Elymais =

Late 1st-century ruler of Elymais

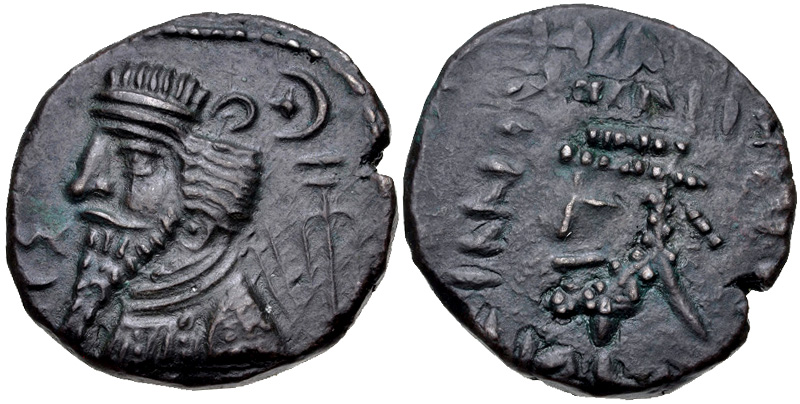
Coin of Orodes I

Orodes I of Elymais was the ruler of Elymais in the late 1st-century. Unlike the previous rulers of the kingdom, he belonged to a cadet branch of the Arsacid dynasty. His reign thus marks the start of a second line of rulers that replaced the original Kamnaskirid line. While the Kamnaskirid rulers only used Greek legends on their coins, the Arsacid rulers of Elymais used both Greek and Aramaic. Orodes I was succeeded by his son Orodes II, known as Kamnaskires-Orodes.

== Sources ==
- Hansman, John F. (1998). "Elymais". Encyclopaedia Iranica, Vol. VIII, Fasc. 4. pp. 373–376.
- Rezakhani, Khodadad (2013). "Arsacid, Elymaean, and Persid Coinage". In Potts, Daniel T. (ed.). The Oxford Handbook of Ancient Iran. Oxford University Press. ISBN 978-0199733309.

Unknown	King of Elymais; 1st-century	Succeeded by Orodes II
