= Anzaze =

1st-century BC queen of the Elymais

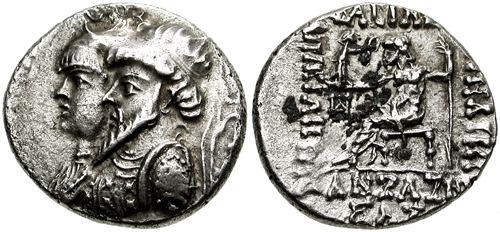
coin: Kamnaskires and Anzaze

Anzaze was a queen of the Elymais (a Parthian vassal kingdom in what is now Iran). She appears on coins together with king Kamnaskires III (about 82/81 BC to 75. BC following dates on the coins). They perhaps ruled together as on the coins she is called βασιλίσσης (the Genitive case of queen - βασίλισσα [basílissa]). Furthermore it was not common on ancient coins that kings and queens appear together, again supporting her special status.

== Literature ==
- D. T. Potts: The Archaeology of Elam, Cambridge University Press, Cambridge 1999, 399 ISBN 0-521-56496-4
