= Parthian bas-relief at Mydan Mishan =

The Parthian bas-relief at Mydan Mishan is located c. 10 kilometers south-west of Hamadan, and 2 kilometers west of the well-known Ganjnameh inscriptions of the Achaemenid Persian period. The relief, dating to the Parthian period, is reachable by crossing the Ganjnameh Valley towards the Alvand range.

== Description ==
The bas-relief was created within a 90×60×20 cm stone niche. The carved figure depicts a male lying on what appears to be the upper part of a klinē. The figure holds a drinking bowl or a goblet-like item in his left hand close to the chest. Four "flowerlike" elements are depicted close to the raised right hand of the figure, along with what appears to be a possible second drinking vessel. On the left of the relief, a small globe is depicted, which could represent a celestial sign. The figure also wears a conical hat, typical of Parthian art, but without decoration. Due to the lack of detail, it is yet unknown whether its a Scythian hat, a bashlyk typical of early Arsacid-period coin representations, or perhaps even " a rendering of the subjects' hair".

The figure wears typical Parthian clothing. This includes wearing a belt "with traces of a floral motive, possibly what is left of a belt made of plaques similar to that worn by Vologases on the Parthian Stone relief". He also wears Parthian riding boots. The male figure perhaps represents a wealthy person or some kind of dignitary. However, according to Hemati Azandaryani et al., the low quality of the relief would suggest that the man in question was not a prominent figure of Hamadan in the Arsacid period, and was perhaps rather a member of the "middle class" who wanted to have himself depicted in a leisure activity.

It terms of composition elements, it shares strong similarities to the Parthian bas-relief found at the nearby Yakhchal Valley. However, there are still several evident relevant differences observable when comparing the two, in terms of style, technique and status of preservation. The Mydan Mishan relief also shares many common elements with the Tang-e Sarvak rock carvings. The position of the legs which the Mydan Mishan relief shares with numerous Parthian reliefs is also shared by the well-known Statue of Hercules in Behistun.

According to Hemati Azandaryani et al. it is yet unknown when the bas-relief was precisely created during the Parthian era; a Late Parthian date (2nd- early 3rd century AD) is suggested due to its similarities with Tang-e Sarvak. However, a more general date post-141 BC appears to be more cautious.

== Sources ==
- Hemati Azandaryani, E.; Gregoratti, L.; Mohammadifar, Y.; Didari, Hamid (2021). "Mydan Mishan: A Newly Found Parthian Bas-Relief in the Alvand Range, Hamadan, Western Iran". Iran: Journal of the British Institute of Persian Studies. doi:10.1080/05786967.2021.1960882.
