= Elymais =

Parthian vassal state (147 BC–224 AD)

Coordinates: 32°19′N 48°26′E

- 147 BC–221/222 AD
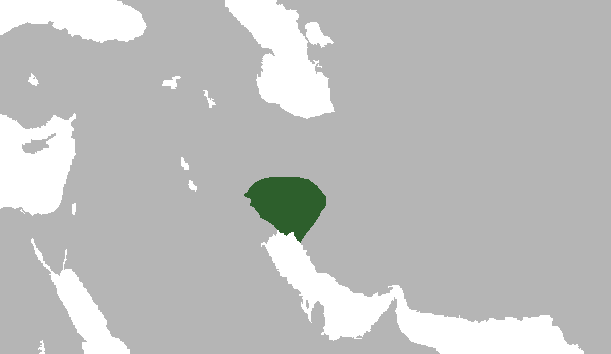
- Approximate extent of Elymais in 51 BC.
- Status: Autonomous state, frequently a vassal of the Parthian Empire
- Capital: Susa
- Government: Monarchy
- King of Elymais
  - ca. 147 BC: Kamnaskires I Soter
  - 221/222 AD: Orodes V
- Historical era: Classical antiquity
  - Established: 147 BC
  - Disestablished: 221/222 AD
Preceded by	Succeeded by
Seleucid Empire	Sasanian Empire

Elymais or Elamais (Ἐλυμαΐς, Hellenic form of the more ancient name, Elam) was an autonomous state of the 2nd century BC to the early 3rd century AD, frequently a vassal under Parthian control. It was located at the head of the Persian Gulf in Susiana (the present-day region of Khuzestan, Iran). Most of the population probably descended from the ancient Elamites, who once had control of that area.

== General information ==
The Elymaeans were reputed to be skilled archers. In 187 BC, they killed Antiochus III the Great after he had pillaged their temple of Bel. Nothing is known of their language, even though Elamite was still used by the Achaemenid Empire 250 years before the kingdom of Elymais came into existence. A number of Aramaic inscriptions are found in Elymais.

The region's "wealth in silver and gold" is referred to in the deutero-canonical work 1 Maccabees, which refers to Elymais as a "city" of interest to Antiochus IV Epiphanes: the narrative there states that "its temple was very rich, containing golden coverings, breastplates, and weapons left there by Alexander son of Philip, the Macedonian king who first reigned over the Greeks. So [Antiochus] came and tried to take the city and plunder it, but he could not because his plan had become known to the citizens." Jewish historian Uriel Rappaport writes that the author of 1 Maccabees was "mistaken" - "Elymais was not a city but a country" - and that "no story about treasures [Alexander] left in Elymais is mentioned elsewhere".

The provinces of Elymais were Massabatice (later Masabadhan), Corbiane and Gabiane. Susa lay to the east of the territory of Elymais. The kingdom of Elymais survived until its extinction by a Sasanian invasion in the early 3rd century AD.

== Coinage ==
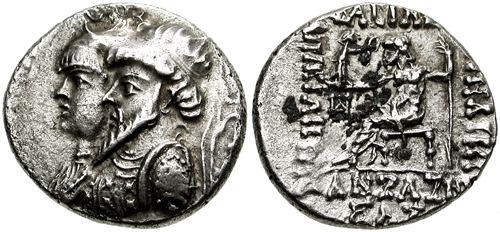
Coin of Kamnaskires III, king of the Elymais, and his wife Anzaze

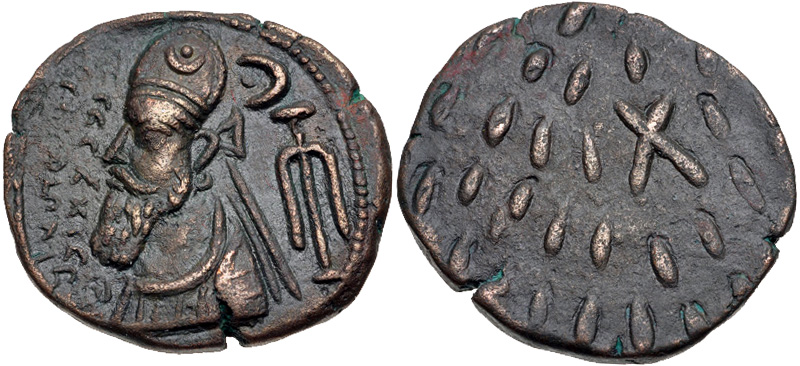
Coin of Phraates, Early-mid 2nd century AD

The coins of Elymais depicted a king; it is not known whether this was a Parthian king or a local ruler, as such information has not come to light. These coins were based on Greek standards of debased Drachms and Tetradrachms. The royal picture is generally based on Parthian coinage, usually with an anchor with a star in crescent figure. The reverse has a figure or bust of Artemis with text around it, an eagle, or often only elongated dots (this has led numismatists to believe that the engravers didn't know Greek or copied from coins whose writing was already unintelligible).

A variant of Aramaic, which was more conservative than the contemporary Late Old Eastern Aramaic spoken in eastern Mesopotamia, has been recorded in Elymais until the rise of the Sasanians. The chancellery of Elymais developed its own variant of the Aramaic alphabet, which was characterized by cursive letters and frequent use of ligatures, apparently influenced by the contemporary Parthian chancellery script. However, there is no evidence that Aramaic was a spoken language in Elymais. It is recorded only in coins (since Orodes III) and inscriptions, such as those of Tang-e Sarvak.

== List of kings ==
=== Kamnaskirid dynasty ===
- Kamnaskires I Soter (c. 147 BC ?)
- Kamnaskires II Nikephoros (c. 147–139 BC)
- From 140/139 BC, Elymais was then under direct Parthian control for several decades, with occasional rebellions, until around 82 BC. Known usurpers or rebels include:
  - Okkonapses (c. 139/138–137 BC) (Note: Rezakhani (2013) placed Okkonapses significantly earlier, as a local rebel already in 188–187 BC, against the Seleucid king Antiochus III.)
  - Tigraios (c. 137–132 BC) (Note: Shayegan (2011) speculates that an Elamite prince referenced in Babylonian sources, Kamnaskires Soter, was placed on the Elamite throne by the Parthian king Phraates II after Tigraios's defeat and ruled Elymais 133–130 BC. Other scholars omit this figure.)
  - Darius Soter (c. 129 BC)
  - Pittit (125–124 BC)
- Kamnaskires III with Anzaze (c. 82–62/61 BC) (Note: Kamnaskires III's and Anzaze's coins are attested 82–75 BC. Shayegan (2011) speculated that they ruled until having diplomatic dealings with the Roman general Pompey in 62/61 after which they were replaced by the Parthians with their son, also named Kamnaskires.)
- Kamnaskires IV (1st century BC)
- Kamnaskires V (late 1st century BC)
- Kamnaskires VI (mid/late 1st century AD) (Note: Kamnaskires VI is always depicted as old on his coins, perhaps reflecting records of an unidentified Kamnaskires living to the age of 96.)

=== Arsacid dynasty ===
- Orodes I (late 1st century)
- Orodes II (late 1st/early 2nd century)
- Phraates (late 1st/early 2nd century)
- Osroes (2nd century)
- Orodes III with Ulfan (2nd century)
- Abar-Basi (2nd century)
- Orodes IV (from c. 165/170)
- Khwasak (3rd century)
- Orodes V (3rd century)

== Bibliography ==
- Hansman, John F. (1998). "Elymais". Encyclopaedia Iranica.
- Hill, George Francis (1922). Catalogue of the Greek Coins of Arabia, Mesopotamia and Persia (Nabataea, Arabia, Provincia, S. Arabia, Mesopotamia, Babylonia, Assyria, Persia, Alexandrine Empire of the East, Persis, Elymais, Characene). London: Order of the Trustees. OCLC 1041623470.
- Pakzadian, Hasan. "The Coins of Elymais", Tehran, 2007. (in Persian)
- Potts, Daniel T., ed. (2017). The Oxford Handbook of Ancient Iran. Oxford University Press. pp. 1–1021. ISBN 9780190668662.
- Rezakhani, Khodadad (2013). "Arsacid, Elymaean and Persid coinage". In Potts, Daniel T. (ed.). Oxford Handbook of Ancient Iran. Oxford: Oxford University Press. pp. 766–777. ISBN 978-0-19-973330-9.
- Shayegan, M. Rahim (2011). Arsacids and Sasanians: Political Ideology in Post-Hellenistic and Late Antique Persia. Cambridge: Cambridge University Press. ISBN 978-0521766418.
- van't Haaff, Pieter Anne (2007). Catalogue of Elymaean Coinage: Ca. 147 B.C.-A.D. 228. Lancaster: Classical Numismatic Group. ISBN 978-0-9709268-8-3.
- Wiesehöfer, Josef (1996). Ancient Persia: from 550 BC to 650 AD. Translated by Azodi, Azizeh. London: I. B. Tauris. ISBN 1-85043-999-0.
