= Kamnaskires III =

King of the Elymais from 82/81 BC to 75 BC

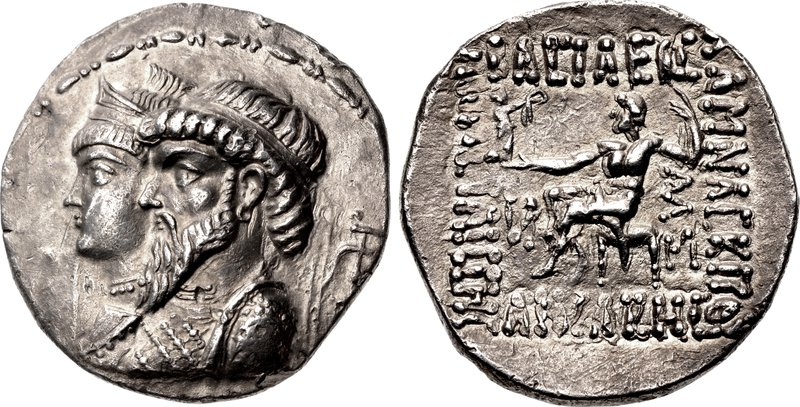
- Coin of Kamnaskires III with his queen Anzaze

King of Elymais
- Reign: 82/1–75 BC
- Predecessor: Parthian rule
- Successor: Kamnaskires IV
- Co-ruler: Anzaze
- Died: 75 BC
- Spouse: Anzaze
- Dynasty: Kamnaskirid

Kamnaskires III (also spelled Kammashkiri III) was the Kamnaskirid king of Elymais from 82/1 BC to 75 BC. Elymais had since 124 BC been under complete Parthian control. However, in 81/80 BC, coins of king Kamnaskires III and his wife Anzaze appears, which indicates that the kingdom had been restored. According to Babylonian sources, the incumbent Parthian monarch Orodes I (r. 80–75 BC) launched an expedition into Elymais in 78 BC, where he defeated Kamnaskires III. Kamnaskires III was not deposed, however, and continued ruling the kingdom now as a Parthian vassal. Kamnaskires III's successor is unknown, however, it is known that Kamnaskires IV ruled Elymais from 62/1 BCE.

== Sources ==
- Kia, Mehrdad (2016). The Persian Empire: A Historical Encyclopedia. ABC-Clio. ISBN 978-1610693912. (2 volumes)
- Hansman, John F. (1998). "Elymais". Encyclopaedia Iranica, Vol. VIII, Fasc. 4. pp. 373–376.
- G. J. P. McEwan: A Parthian Campaign against Elymais in 77 B.C., in: Iran, 24 (1986), pp. 91-94
- D. T. Potts: The Archaeology of Elam, Cambridge University Press, Cambridge 1999, p. 392
- Rezakhani, Khodadad (2013). "Arsacid, Elymaean, and Persid Coinage". In Potts, Daniel T. (ed.). The Oxford Handbook of Ancient Iran. Oxford University Press. ISBN 978-0199733309.
- Shayegan, M. Rahim (2011). Arsacids and Sasanians: Political Ideology in Post-Hellenistic and Late Antique Persia. Cambridge University Press. pp. 1–539. ISBN 9780521766418.

Preceded by Parthian rule	King of Elymais; 82/1–75 BC	Succeeded by Kamnaskires IV
