= Orodes II of Elymais =

Late 1st-century ruler of Elymais

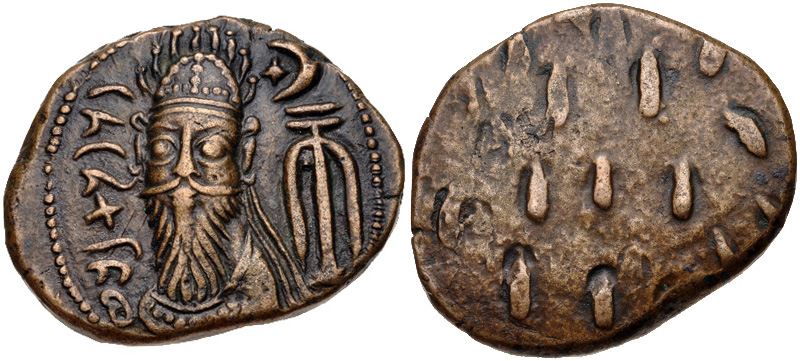
Coin of Orodes II

Orodes II of Elymais, also known as Kamnaskires-Orodes, was the ruler of Elymais in the late 1st century. He was the son and successor of Orodes I, and was himself succeeded by a certain Phraates.

== Sources ==
- Hansman, John F. (1998). "Elymais". Encyclopædia Iranica, Vol. VIII, Fasc. 4. pp. 373–376.
- Rezakhani, Khodadad (2013). "Arsacid, Elymaean, and Persid Coinage". In Potts, Daniel T. (ed.). The Oxford Handbook of Ancient Iran. Oxford University Press. ISBN 978-0199733309.

Preceded by Orodes I	King of Elymais; 1st-century	Succeeded by Phraates
