= Seleucid Empire =

Hellenistic state in West Asia (312–63 BC)

- 312–63 BC
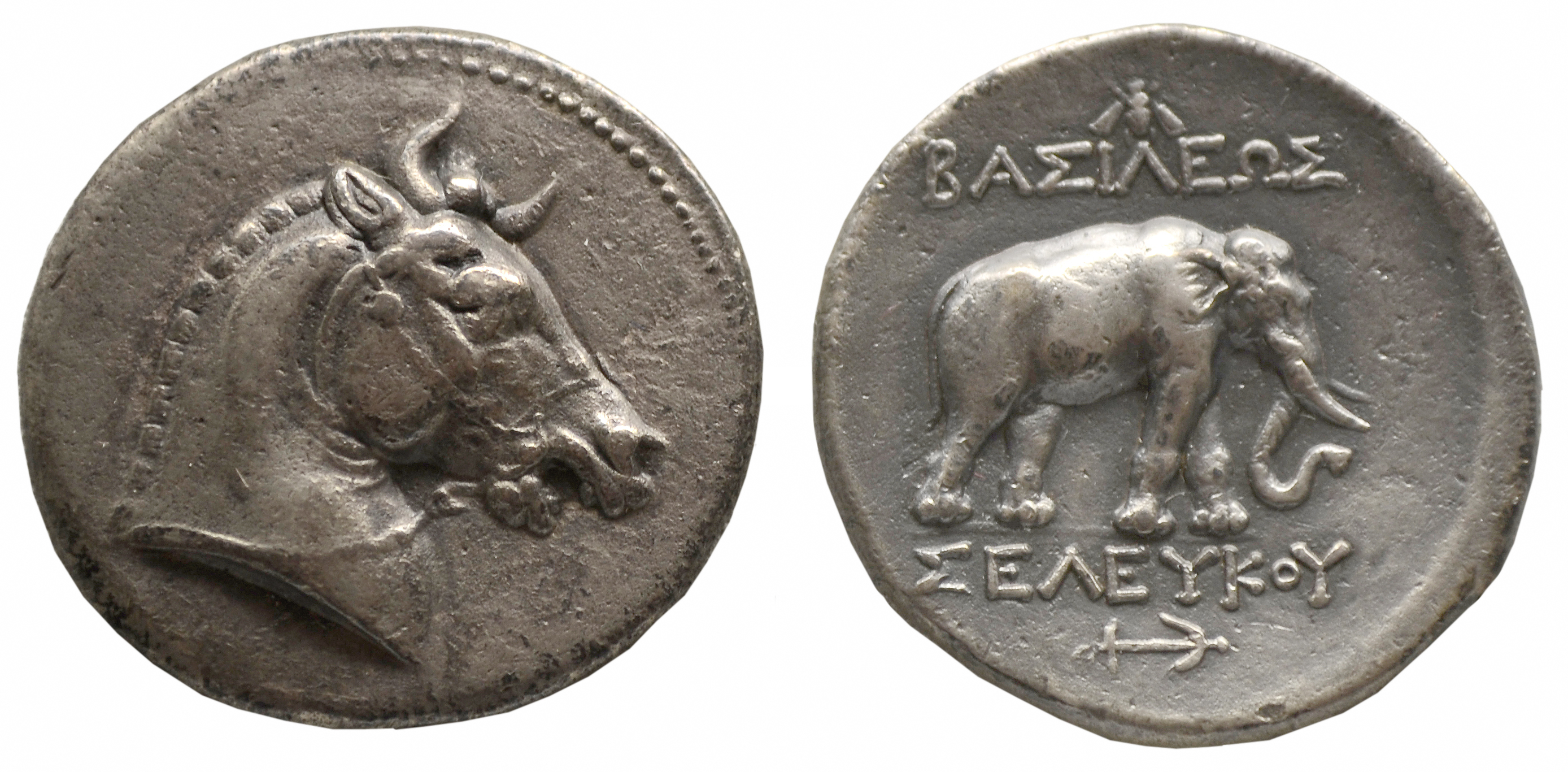
- Inscribed tetradrachm of Seleucus I with symbols of the Seleucid monarchy (Note: The horned horse, the elephant, the anchor, and the goddesses Nike and Tyche were common Seleucid symbols.)

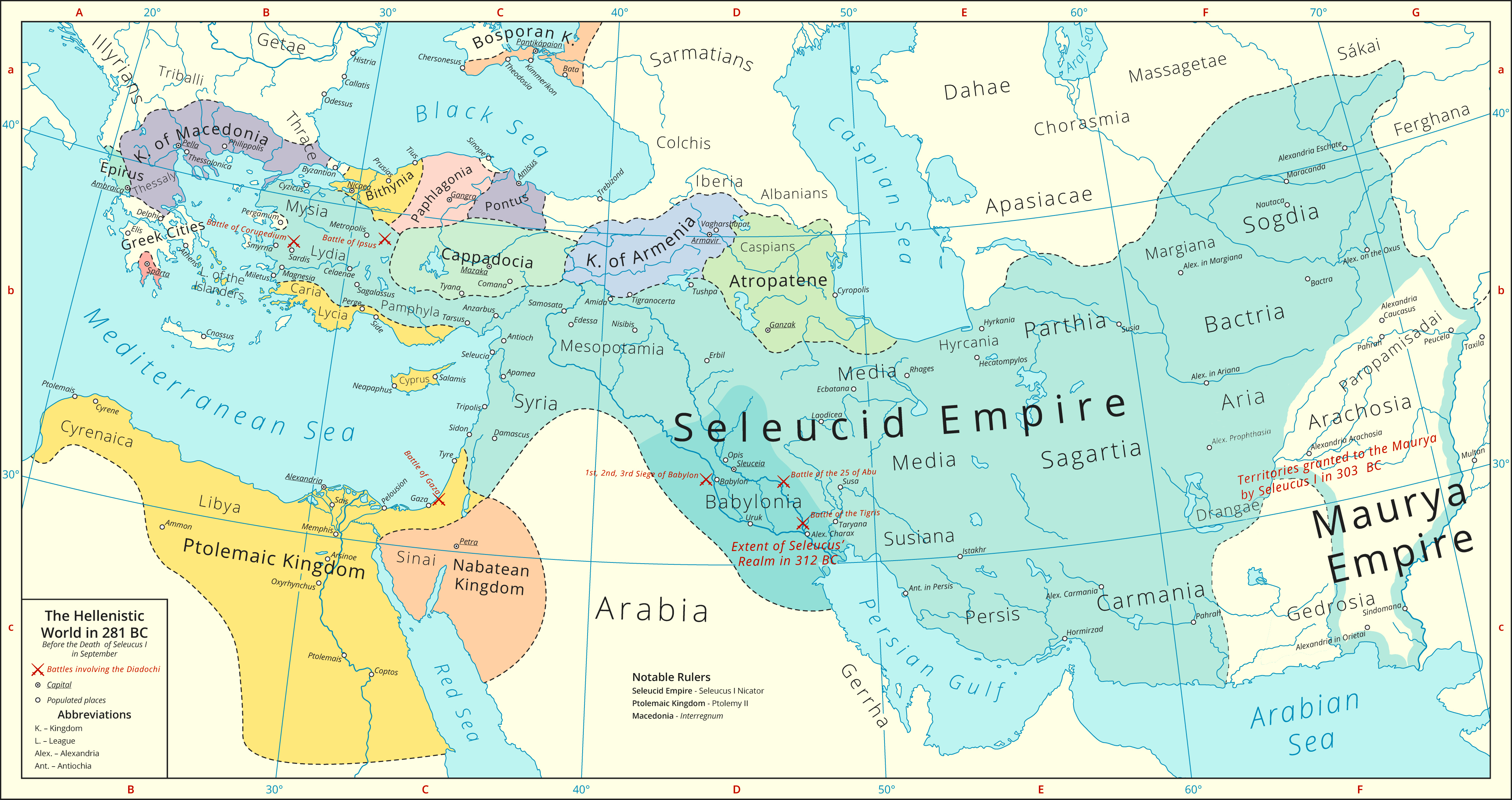
- Seleucid territory in 281 BC, on the eve of the murder of Seleucus I Nicator
- Capital: Babylon (312–305 BC); Seleucia (305–240 BC); Antioch (240–63 BC)
- Common languages: Greek (official); Old Persian; Middle Aramaic
- Religion: Olympianism / Hellenism; Babylonian religion; Hellenistic Judaism; Zoroastrianism
- Government: Monarchy
- Basileus
  - 305–281 BC: Seleucus I (first)
  - 65–63 BC: Philip II (last)
- Historical era: Hellenistic period
  - Wars of the Diadochi: 312 BC
  - Battle of Ipsus: 301 BC
  - Start of the Seleucid-Parthian Wars: 238 BC
  - Roman-Seleucid War: 192–188 BC
  - Maccabean Revolt: 167–160 BC
  - Seleucia taken by Parthians: 141–129 BC
  - Parthian campaign of Antiochus VII: 129 BC
  - Annexed by Rome: 63 BC

Area
- 303 BC: 3,000,000 km^{2} (1,200,000 sq mi)
- 301 BC: 3,900,000 km^{2} (1,500,000 sq mi)
- 240 BC: 2,600,000 km^{2} (1,000,000 sq mi)
- 175 BC: 800,000 km^{2} (310,000 sq mi)
- 100 BC: 100,000 km^{2} (39,000 sq mi)

Population
  - 301 BC: 30,000,000+
Preceded by
Macedonian Empire
Succeeded by
Parthian Empire
Maurya Empire
Province of Syria
Greco-Bactrian Kingdom
Hasmonean kingdom
Osroene
Elymais

The Seleucid Empire (/sɪˈljuːsɪd/ sih-LEW-sid) was a Greek state in West Asia during the Hellenistic period. It was founded by the Macedonian general Seleucus I Nicator in 312 BC, following the division of Alexander the Great's empire, and was ruled by the Seleucid dynasty from Seleucia and later Antioch until its annexation by the Roman Republic under Pompey in 63 BC.

After receiving the Mesopotamian regions of Babylonia and Assyria in 321 BC, Seleucus I began expanding his dominions to include the Near Eastern territories that include modern Iraq, Iran, Afghanistan, Syria and Lebanon, all of which had been under Macedonian control after the fall of the former Achaemenid Empire. At the Seleucid Empire's height, it had consisted of territory that covered Anatolia, Persia, the Levant, Mesopotamia and what are now modern Kuwait, Afghanistan and parts of Turkmenistan in Central Asia.

The Seleucid Empire was a center of Hellenistic culture. Greek customs and language were privileged; the wide variety of local traditions had been generally tolerated, while an urban Greek elite had formed the dominant political class and was reinforced by steady migration from Greece. The empire's western territories were repeatedly contested with Ptolemaic Egypt—a rival Hellenistic state. To the east, the Seleucid–Mauryan War with the Indian ruler Chandragupta of the Maurya Empire in 305 BC led to a political alliance and the cession of territories conquered by Alexander along the Indus River, east of Bactria.

In the early second century BC, Antiochus III the Great fought the Roman–Seleucid war into Hellenistic Greece, but his attempts were thwarted by the Roman Republic and its Greek allies at the Battle of Magnesia. The Seleucids were forced to pay war reparations and had to relinquish territorial claims west of the Taurus Mountains in southern Anatolia, marking the gradual decline of the empire. Mithridates I of Parthia conquered much of the remaining eastern lands of the Seleucid Empire in the mid-second century BC, including Assyria and what had been Babylonia, while the independent Greco-Bactrian Kingdom continued to flourish in the northeast. The Seleucid kings were thereafter reduced to a rump state in Syria after a civil war, until their conquest by Tigranes the Great of Armenia in 83 BC, and ultimate overthrow by the Roman general Pompey in 63 BC.

== Name ==
Contemporary sources, such as a loyalist decree honoring Antiochus I from Ilium, in Greek language define the Seleucid state both as an empire (ἀρχή, archḗ) and as a kingdom (βασιλεία, basileía). Similarly, Seleucid rulers were described as kings in Babylonia.

The rulers did not describe themselves as being of any particular territory or people, but starting from the 2nd century BC, ancient writers referred to them as the Syrian kings, the kings of Syria or of the Syrians, the kings descended from Seleucus Nicator, the kings of Asia, and other designations.

== History ==
=== Partition of Alexander's empire ===
Alexander, who quickly conquered the Persian Empire under its last Achaemenid dynast, Darius III, died young in 323 BC, leaving an expansive empire of partly Hellenised culture without an adult heir. The empire was put under the authority of a regent, Perdiccas, and the vast territories were divided among Alexander's generals, who thereby became satraps at the Partition of Babylon, all in that same year.

=== Rise of Seleucus ===
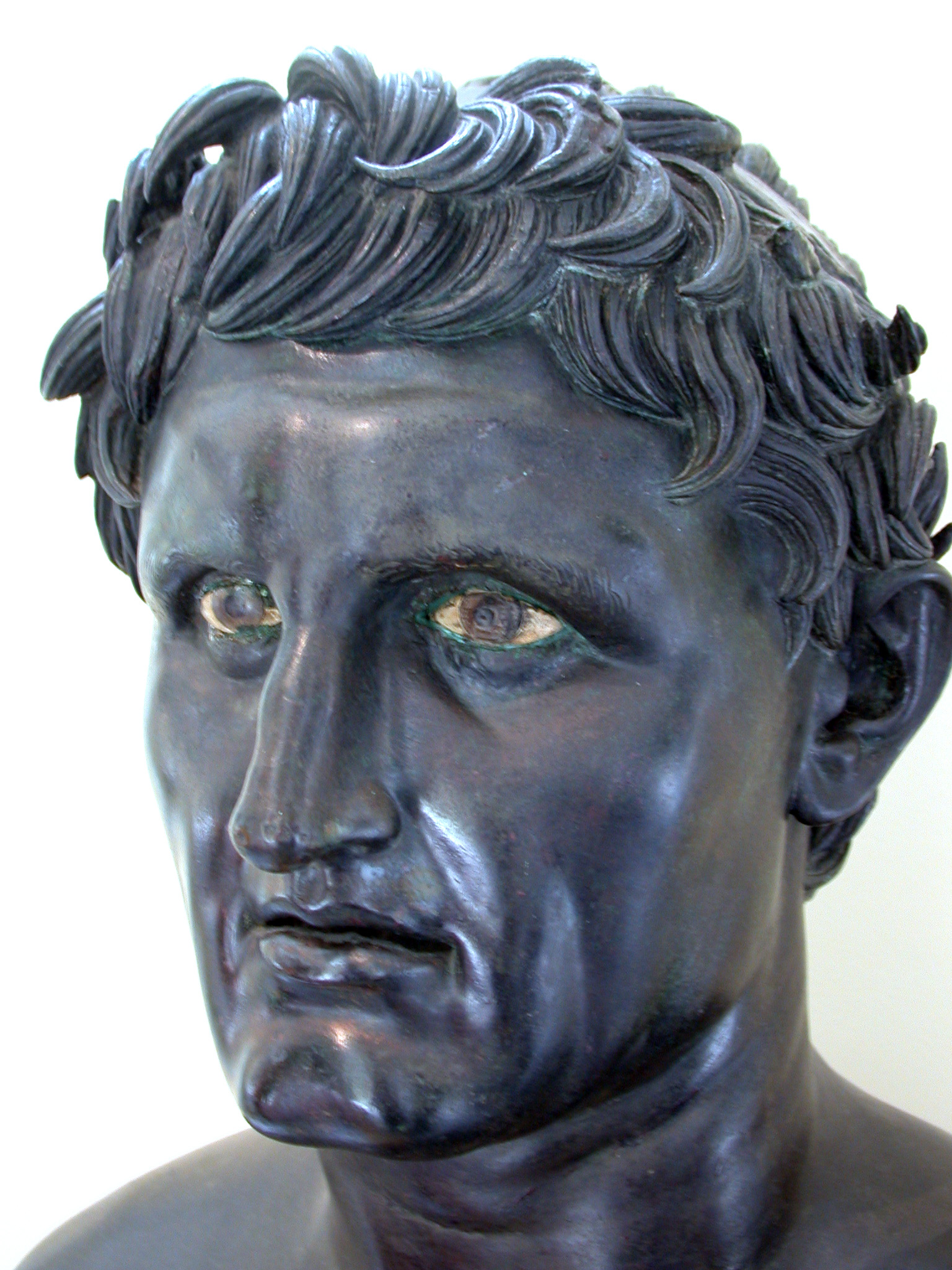
Bronze bust of Seleucus I Nicator.

Alexander's generals, known as diadochi, jostled for supremacy over parts of his empire following his death. Ptolemy I Soter, a former general and then current satrap of Egypt, was the first to challenge the new system, which eventually led to the demise of Perdiccas. Ptolemy's revolt created a new subdivision of the empire with the Partition of Triparadisus in 320 BC. Seleucus, who had been "Commander-in-Chief of the Companion cavalry" (hetairoi) and appointed first or court chiliarch (which made him the senior officer in the Royal Army after the regent and commander-in-chief Perdiccas since 323 BC, though he helped to assassinate him later) received Babylonia. Antigonus eventually forced Seleucus out of Babylon around 315 BC and he fled to Egypt.

At the battle of Gaza in 312 BC, Ptolemy I Soter and Seleucus defeated Demetrius. After this battle Seleucus spent the winter in Syria, and with his army travelled across Syria and advanced back toward Babylon, arriving in there in April 311 BC.

=== Babylonian War and initial conquests (311–309 BC) ===
Seleucus declared himself "general" and "strategos autokrater of Asia" around May-June 311 BC shortly after arriving in Babylon. His goal was to usurp Antigonos' power. Antigonos reoccupied Syria shortly thereafter. When Seleucus arrived in Babylon he faced resistance from the Antigonid military governor Diphilus, who commanded a citadel in the city. Seleucus and his army captured the citadel and took control of Babylon in August 311 BC, implying months of resistance.

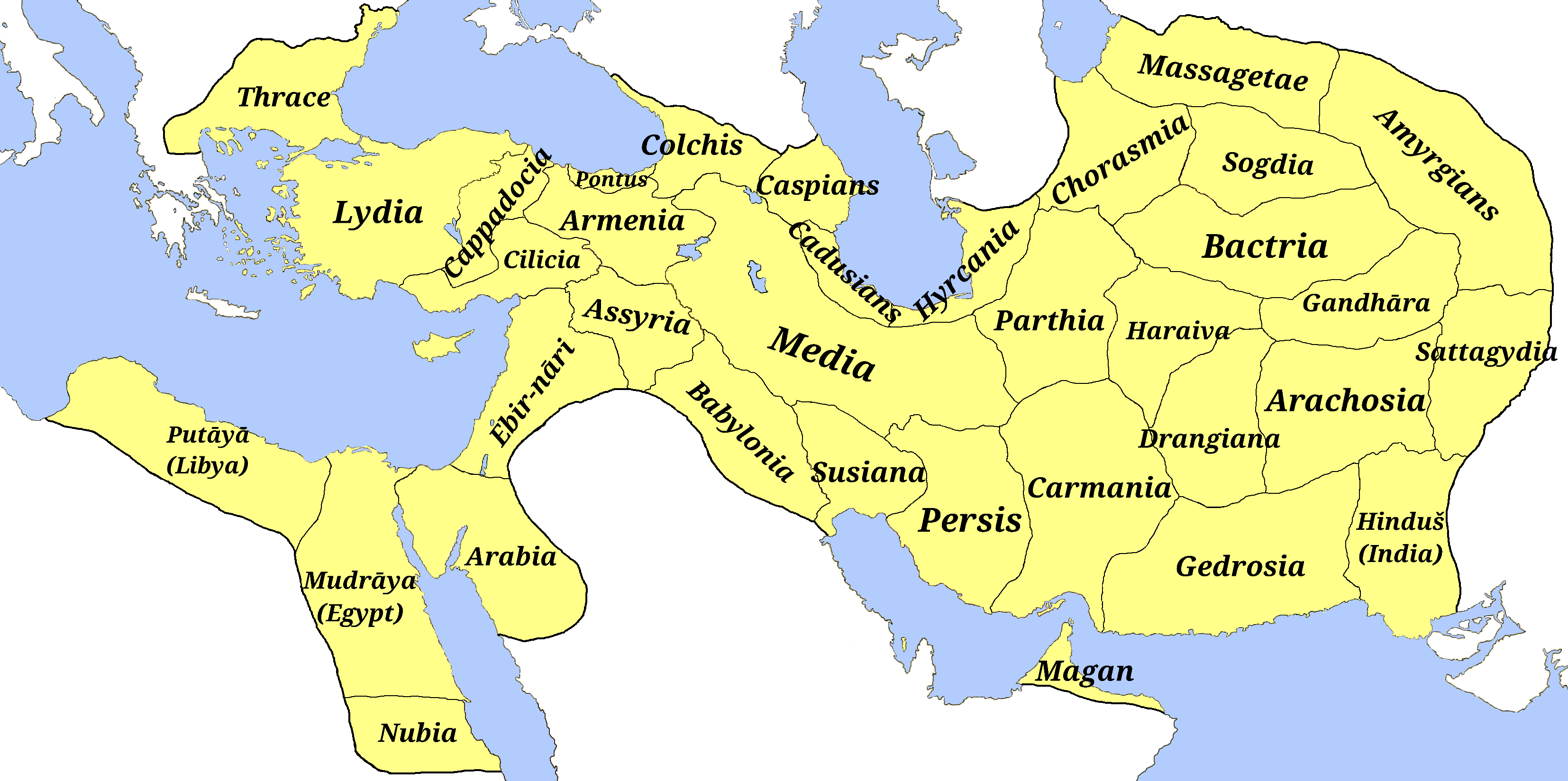
Seleucus captured the Upper Satrapies: Media, Susiana, Persis and possibly Parthia and Carmania from 311-309 BC

Nicanor, a prominent Antigonid loyalist and military commander, raised a substantial force that aimed to retake Babylon from Seleucus. He and his army marched from Ecbatana (most likely utilizing the Royal Road that passed along the Diyala River valley) and eventually reached Opis near the Tigris around September 331 BC.

Seleucus responded immediately with a far smaller army and hid his men in the marshes along the Tigris. Nicanor was unaware of Seleucus' presence in the area and set up a camp. Nicanor's guards were attacked stealthily during the night and his army quickly surrendered. Nicanor escaped to Ecbatana and Seleucus proceeded to capture Susiana, where he remained for winter quarters.

Seleucus continued his campaigning the following year in the spring/summer of 310 BC, subsequently launching a full-scale invasion of Media and killing and deposing Nicanor. With Nicanor removed from power, Seleucus was easily able to establish control and conquer the Upper Satrapies.

Antigonos sent his son Demetrius to Babylon with a very large army to recover the city around the summer of 310 BC. Seleucus was absent from Babylon during this time and his general Patrocles conducted the defense. Patrocles ordered all civilians to vacate the city and requested aid from Seleucus, who was in Media. When Demetrius arrived he found the city empty and immediately captured the twin citadels. Demetrius left the city around March 309 BC after facing resistance from the second citadel, and left his general Archelaeus in charge. Around August 310 BC Antigonos' army invaded the city, and a large-scale war broke out between Antigonos and Seleucid in Babylon, which continued up to August 309 BC. The fighting is likely encapsulated by Polyaenus:

Seleucus met Antigonus in battle; the issue of the battle was evenly poised. When night approached both armies decided to adjourn until the next day. The troops of Antigonus, taking off their arms, made camp, but Seleucus instructed his soldiers to eat and sleep in their arms while maintaining battle order. Just before dawn Seleucus’ army advanced, ready armed and drawn up in order of battle, and the Antigonid men, caught unarmed and in disarray, soon yielded the victory to their foes

— Polyaenus, Stratagems, 4.9.1

This was the final war between Seleucus and Antigonos over Babylon. All Antigonid forces were removed from Babylon by 308 BC.

=== Seleucid–Mauryan War (305–303 BC) ===
Chandragupta Maurya (Sandrokottos) founded the Maurya Empire in 321 BC after the conquest of the Nanda Empire and their capital Pataliputra in Magadha. Chandragupta then redirected his attention to the Indus River region, and by 317 BC, he conquered the remaining Greek satraps left by Alexander. Expecting a confrontation, Seleucus gathered his army and marched to the Indus. It is said that Chandragupta could have fielded a conscript army of 600,000 men and 9,000 war elephants. According to Appian,

He [Seleucus] crossed the Indus and waged war with Sandrocottus [Maurya], king of the Indians, who dwelt on the banks of that stream, until they came to an understanding with each other and contracted a marriage relationship.

While the Greek sources have been interpreted by some as a Mauryan victory, (Note: Military historian John D. Grainger concludes that Seleucus invaded India, and was defeated, but states that "[b]eyond that, it is not possible to go without further evidence." There is "little or no evidence" for the idea that Chandragupta drove back Seleucus' forces as far back as Bactria. Other authors are equally cautious.. Basham states that Seleucus "seems to have suffered the worst of the engagement." Romila Thapar speaks of "a campaign against Seleucus, in which Chandragupta seems to have been successful, judging by the terms of the treaty of 303 BC." Kulke and Rothermund state that Chandragupta "stopped his march east," and then present the terms of the peace treaty. Keay states that "perhaps he was roundly defeated. The terms of the peace treaty certainly suggest so.") the details of the conflict, and if there was in fact a pitched battle, are unknown, and Jansani warns that "there are very little details about the battle or skirmish they fought, and that none of the ancient authors depicted either Seleucus or Chandragupta as the clear victor of this battle. This lack of information about the encounter and the ensuing treaty means that it is impossible to reconstruct them." Wheatley and Heckel suggest that the degree of friendly Maurya-Seleucid relations established after the war implies that the hostilities were probably "neither prolonged nor grievous".

Chandragupta received, formalized through a treaty, territory west of the Indus, including the Hindu Kush, modern day Afghanistan, and the eastern part of Balochistan province of Pakistan, bordering on the Indus. Archaeologically, concrete indications of Mauryan rule, such as the inscriptions of the Edicts of Ashoka, are known as far as Kandahar in southern Afghanistan.

"Chandra Gupta Maurya entertains his bride from Babylon": a conjectural interpretation of the "marriage agreement" between the Seleucids and Chandragupta Maurya, related by Appian.

It is generally thought that Chandragupta married Seleucus's daughter, or a Macedonian princess, a gift from Seleucus to formalize an alliance. In a return gesture, Chandragupta sent 500 war elephants, a military asset which would play a decisive role at the Battle of Ipsus in 301 BC. In addition to this treaty, Seleucus dispatched an ambassador, Megasthenes, to Chandragupta, and later Deimakos to his son Bindusara, at the Mauryan court at Pataliputra (modern Patna). Megasthenes wrote detailed descriptions of India and Chandragupta's reign, which have been partly preserved to us through Diodorus Siculus. Later Ptolemy II Philadelphus, the ruler of Ptolemaic Egypt and contemporary of Ashoka the Great, is also recorded by Pliny the Elder as having sent an ambassador named Dionysius to the Mauryan court.

The Indians occupy [in part] some of the countries situated along the Indus, which formerly belonged to the Persians: Alexander deprived the Ariani of them, and established there settlements of his own. But Seleucus Nicator gave them to Sandrocottus (Chandragupta Maurya) in consequence of a marriage contract, and received in return five hundred elephants.

Other territories ceded before Seleucus' death were Gedrosia in the south-east of the Iranian plateau, and, to the north of this, Arachosia on the west bank of the Indus River.

=== Westward expansion ===
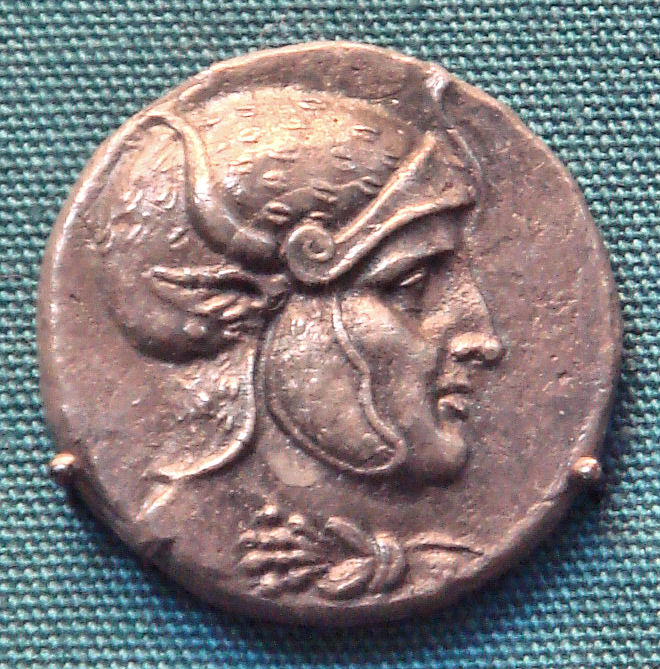
Coin of Seleucus I Nicator, showing the king wearing a helmet decorated with leopard skin and bull's horn and ear.

Following his and Lysimachus' decisive victory over Antigonus at the Battle of Ipsus in 301 BC, Seleucus took control over eastern Anatolia and northern Syria.

In the latter area, he founded a new capital at Antioch on the Orontes, a city he named after his father. An alternative capital was established at Seleucia on the Tigris, north of Babylon. Seleucus's empire reached its greatest extent following his defeat of his erstwhile ally, Lysimachus, at Corupedion in 281 BC, after which Seleucus expanded his control to encompass western Anatolia. He hoped further to take control of Lysimachus's lands in Europe – primarily Thrace and even Macedonia itself, but was assassinated by Ptolemy Ceraunus on landing in Europe.

His son and successor, Antiochus I Soter, was left with an enormous realm consisting of nearly all of the Asian portions of the Empire, but faced with Antigonus II Gonatas in Macedonia and Ptolemy II Philadelphus in Egypt, he proved unable to pick up where his father had left off in conquering the European portions of Alexander's empire.

=== Breakup of Central Asian territories ===
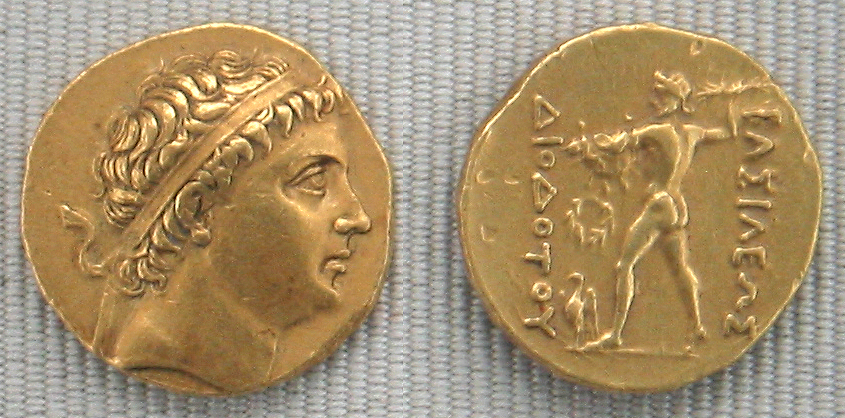
Gold coin of Diodotus, who asserted independence to form the Greco-Bactrian kingdom c. 245 BC. Greek legend reads: ΒΑΣΙΛΕΩΣ ΔΙΟΔΟΤΟΥ, Basileōs Diodotou, "of King Diodotus."

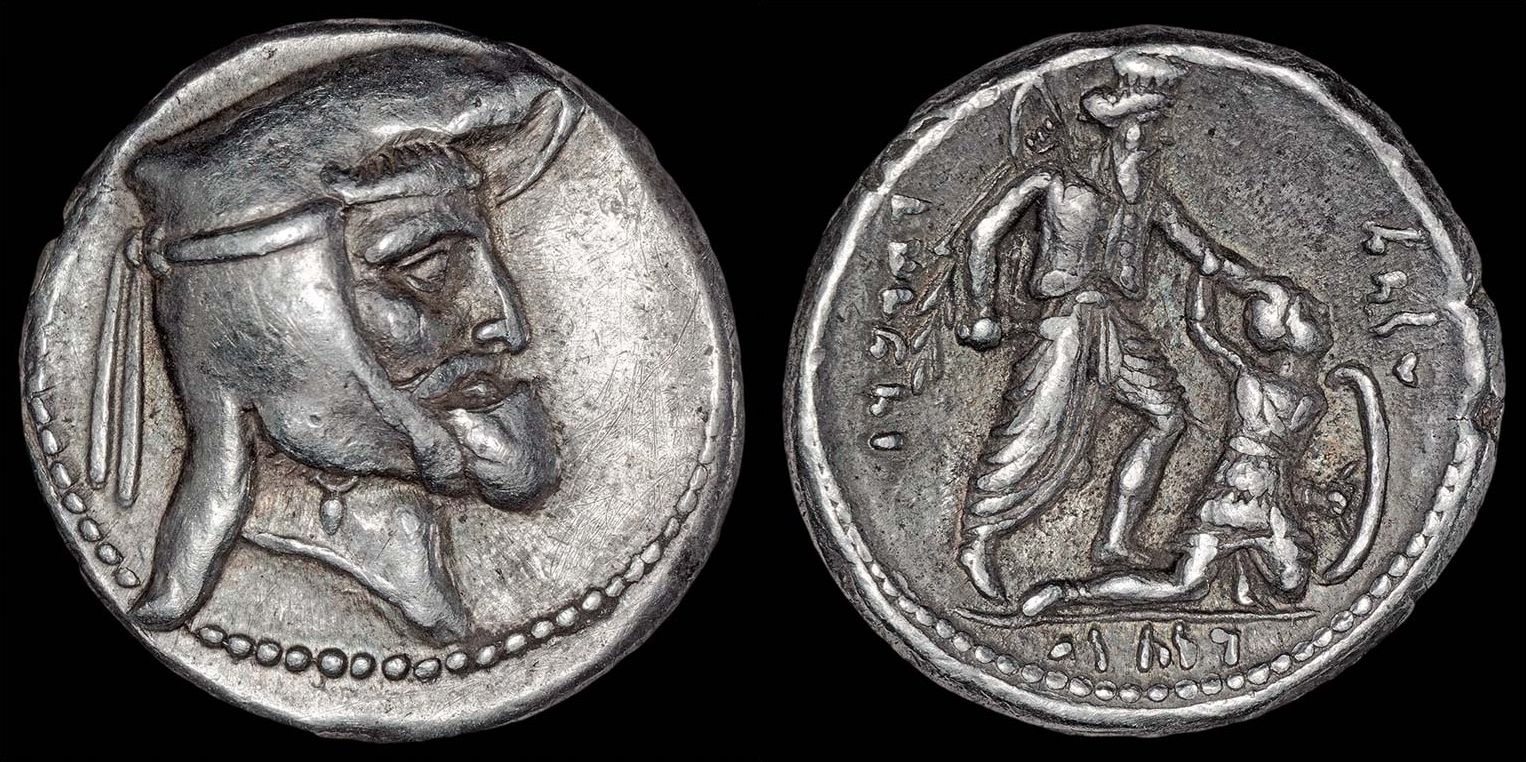
Drachm of the Frataraka ruler Vahbarz (Oborzos), thought to have initiated the independence of Persis from the Seleucid Empire. The coin shows on the reverse an Achaemenid king slaying an armoured, possibly Greek, soldier. This possibly refers to the events related by Polyainos (Strat. 7.40), in which Vahbarz (Oborzos) is said to have killed 3000 Seleucid settlers.

Antiochus I (reigned 281–261 BC) and his son and successor Antiochus II Theos (reigned 261–246 BC) were faced with challenges in the west, including repeated wars with Ptolemy II and a Celtic invasion of Asia Minor—distracting attention from holding the eastern portions of the Empire together. Towards the end of Antiochus II's reign, various provinces simultaneously asserted their independence, such as Bactria and Sogdiana under Diodotus, Cappadocia under Ariarathes III, and Parthia under Andragoras. A few years later, the last was defeated and killed by the invading Parni of Arsaces—the region would then become the core of the Parthian Empire.

Diodotus, the Seleucid governor for the Bactrian territory, asserted independence in around 245 BC, although the exact date is far from certain, to form the Greco-Bactrian Kingdom. This kingdom was characterized by a rich Hellenistic culture and was to continue its domination of Bactria until around 125 BC when it was overrun by the invasion of northern nomads. One of the Greco-Bactrian kings, Demetrius I of Bactria, invaded India around 180 BC to form the Indo-Greek Kingdoms.

The rulers of Persis, called Fratarakas, also seem to have established some level of independence from the Seleucids during the 3rd century BC, especially from the time of Vahbarz. They would later overtly take the title of Kings of Persis, before becoming vassals to the newly formed Parthian Empire.

The Seleucid satrap of Parthia, named Andragoras, first claimed independence, in a parallel to the secession of his Bactrian neighbour. Soon after, however, a Parthian tribal chief called Arsaces invaded the Parthian territory around 238 BC to form the Arsacid dynasty, from which the Parthian Empire originated.

Antiochus II's son Seleucus II Callinicus came to the throne around 246 BC. Seleucus II was soon dramatically defeated in the Third Syrian War against Ptolemy III of Egypt and then had to fight a civil war against his own brother Antiochus Hierax. Taking advantage of this distraction, Bactria and Parthia seceded from the empire. In Asia Minor too, the Seleucid dynasty seemed to be losing control: the Gauls had fully established themselves in Galatia, semi-independent semi-Hellenized kingdoms had sprung up in Bithynia, Pontus, and Cappadocia, and the city of Pergamum in the west was asserting its independence under the Attalid dynasty. The Seleucid economy started to show the first signs of weakness, as Galatians gained independence and Pergamum took control of coastal cities in Anatolia. Consequently, they managed to partially block contact with the West.

=== Revival (223–191 BC) ===
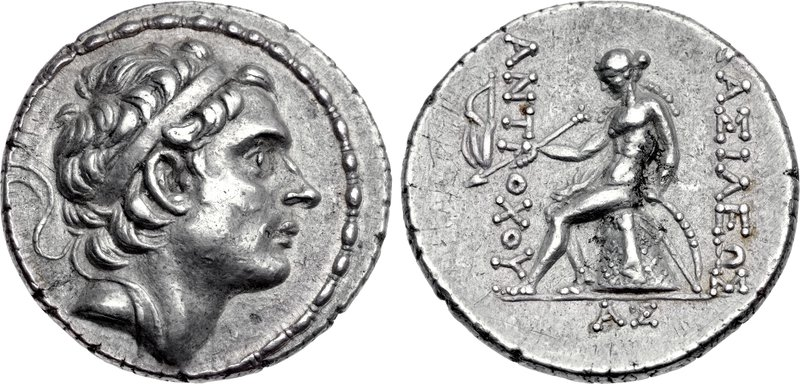
Silver coin of Antiochus III the Great. Reverse shows Apollo seated on omphalos holding bow and arrow. Greek legend reads: ΒΑΣΙΛΕΩΣ ΑΝΤΙΟΧΟΥ, Basileōs Antiochou, "of King Antiochus."

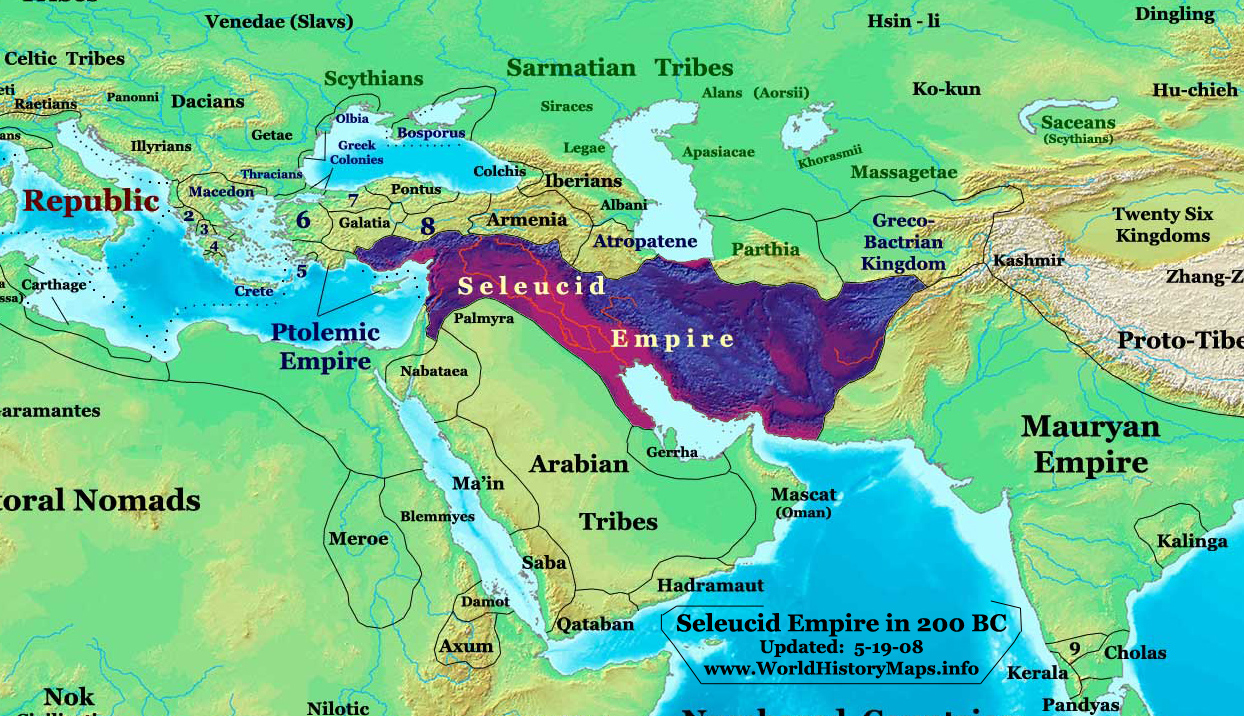
The Seleucid Empire in 200 BC (before expansion into Anatolia and Greece).

A revival would begin when Seleucus II's younger son, Antiochus III the Great, took the throne in 223 BC. Although initially unsuccessful in the Fourth Syrian War against Egypt, which led to a defeat at the Battle of Raphia (217 BC), Antiochus would prove himself to be the greatest of the Seleucid rulers after Seleucus I himself. He spent the next ten years on his anabasis (journey) through the eastern parts of his domain and restoring rebellious vassals like Parthia and Greco-Bactria to at least nominal obedience. He gained many victories such as the Battle of Mount Labus and Battle of the Arius and besieged the Bactrian capital. He even emulated Seleucus with an expedition into India where he met with King Sophagasenus (Sanskrit: Subhagasena) receiving war elephants, perhaps in accordance of the existing treaty and alliance set after the Seleucid-Mauryan War.

Actual translation of Polybius 11.34 (No other source except Polybius makes any reference to Sophagasenus):

He [Antiochus] crossed the Caucasus Indicus (Paropamisus) (Hindu Kush) and descended into India; renewed his friendship with Sophagasenus the king of the Indians; received more elephants, until he had a hundred and fifty altogether; and having once more provisioned his troops, set out again personally with his army: leaving Androsthenes of Cyzicus the duty of taking home the treasure which this king had agreed to hand over to him. Having traversed Arachosia and crossed the river Enymanthus, he came through Drangene to Carmania; and as it was now winter, he put his men into winter quarters there.

When he returned to the west in 205 BC, Antiochus found that with the death of Ptolemy IV, the situation now looked propitious for another western campaign. Antiochus and Philip V of Macedon then made a pact to divide the Ptolemaic possessions outside of Egypt, and in the Fifth Syrian War, the Seleucids ousted Ptolemy V from control of Coele-Syria. The Battle of Panium (200 BC) definitively transferred these holdings from the Ptolemies to the Seleucids. Antiochus appeared, at the least, to have restored the Seleucid Kingdom to glory.

==== Expansion into Greece and war with Rome ====
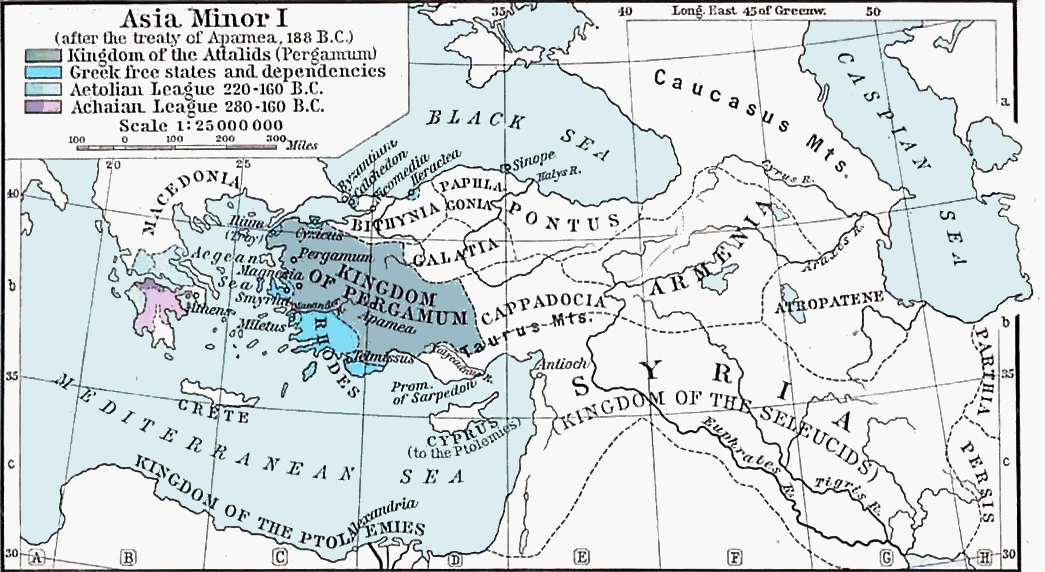
The reduced empire (titled: Syria, Kingdom of the Seleucids) and the expanded states of Pergamum and Rhodes, after the defeat of Antiochus III by Rome. Circa 188 BC.

Following the defeat of his erstwhile ally Philip by Rome in 197 BC, Antiochus saw the opportunity for expansion into Greece itself. Encouraged by the exiled Carthaginian general Hannibal, and making an alliance with the disgruntled Aetolian League, Antiochus launched an invasion across the Hellespont. With his huge army he aimed to establish the Seleucid Empire as the foremost power in the Hellenic world, but these plans put the empire on a collision course with the new rising power of the Mediterranean, the Roman Republic. At the battles of Thermopylae (191 BC) and Magnesia (190 BC), Antiochus's forces suffered resounding defeats, and he was compelled to make peace and sign the Treaty of Apamea (188 BC), the main clause of which saw the Seleucids agree to pay a large indemnity, to retreat from Anatolia and to never again attempt to expand Seleucid territory west of the Taurus Mountains. The Kingdom of Pergamum and the Republic of Rhodes, Rome's allies in the war, gained the former Seleucid lands in Anatolia. Antiochus died in 187 BC on another expedition to the east, where he sought to extract money to pay the indemnity.

=== Roman power, Parthia and Judea ===
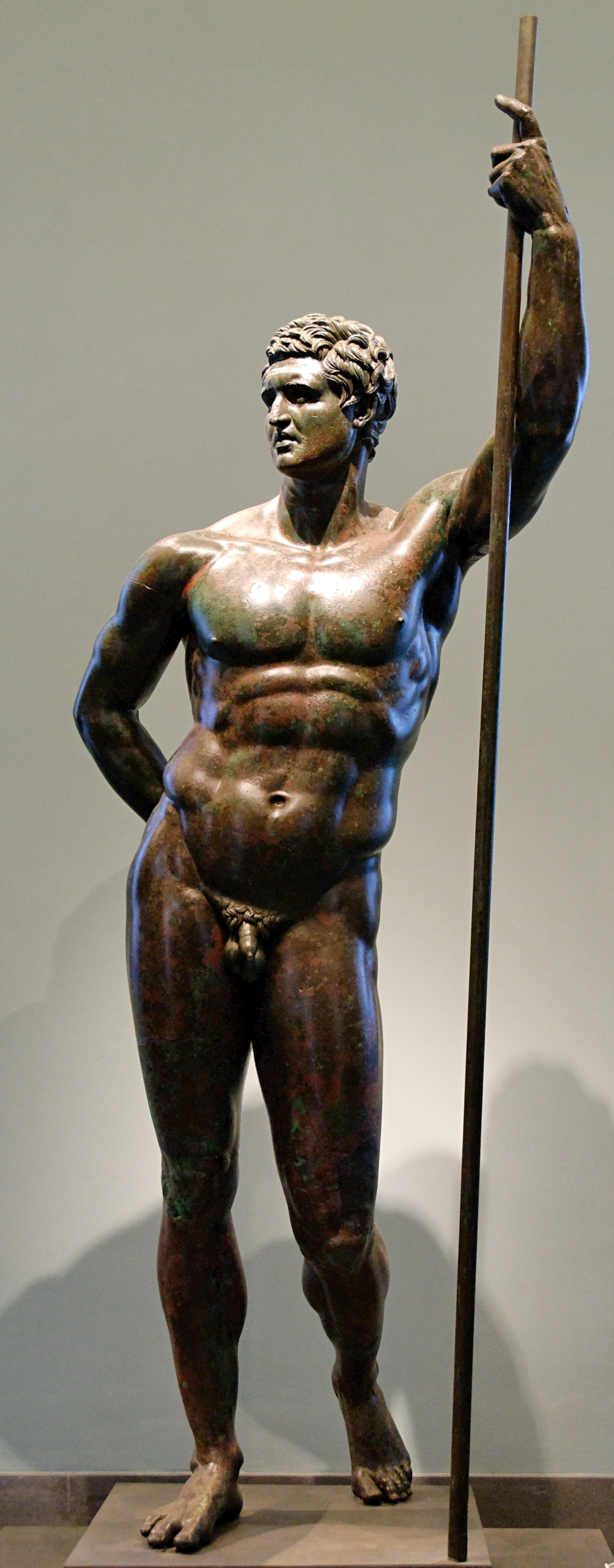
The Hellenistic Prince, a bronze statue originally thought to be a Seleucid, or Attalus II of Pergamon, now considered a portrait of a Roman general, made by a Greek artist working in Rome in the 2nd century BC.

The reign of Antiochus III's son and successor, Seleucus IV Philopator (187–175 BC), was largely spent in attempts to pay the large indemnity, and Seleucus was ultimately assassinated by his minister Heliodorus.

Seleucus' younger brother, Antiochus IV Epiphanes, now seized the throne. He attempted to restore Seleucid power and prestige with a successful war against the old enemy, Ptolemaic Egypt, which met with initial success as the Seleucids defeated and drove the Egyptian army back to Alexandria itself. As the king planned on how to conclude the war, he was informed that Roman commissioners, led by the Proconsul Gaius Popillius Laenas, were near and requesting a meeting with the Seleucid king. Antiochus agreed, but when they met and Antiochus held out his hand in friendship, Popilius placed in his hand the tablets on which was written the decree of the senate and told him to read it. The decree demanded that he should abort his attack on Alexandria and immediately stop waging the war on Ptolemy. When the king said that he would call his friends into council and consider what he ought to do, Popilius drew a circle in the sand around the king's feet with the stick he was carrying and said, "Before you step out of that circle give me a reply to lay before the senate." For a few moments he hesitated, astounded at such a peremptory order, and at last replied, "I will do what the senate thinks right." He then chose to withdraw rather than set the empire to war with Rome again.

On his return journey, according to Josephus, he made an expedition to Judea, took Jerusalem by force, slew a great many who had favored Ptolemy, and sent his soldiers to plunder them without mercy. He also spoiled the temple, and interrupted the constant practice of offering a daily sacrifice of expiation, for three years and six months.

The latter part of his reign saw a further disintegration of the Empire despite his best efforts. Weakened economically, militarily and by loss of prestige, the Empire became vulnerable to rebels in the eastern areas of the empire, who began to further undermine the empire while the Parthians moved into the power vacuum to take over the old Persian lands. Antiochus' aggressive Hellenizing (or de-Judaizing) activities provoked a full scale armed rebellion in Judea—the Maccabean Revolt. Efforts to deal with both the Parthians and the Jews as well as retain control of the provinces at the same time proved beyond the weakened empire's power. Antiochus orchestrated a military campaign, capturing Artaxias I, King of Armenia, and reoccupying Armenia. His offensive ventured as far as Persepolis, but he was forced from the city by the populace. On his return home, Antiochus died in Isfahan in 164 BC.

=== Civil war and further decay ===
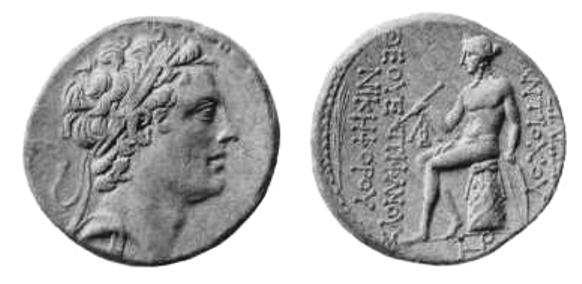
Coin of Antiochus IV Epiphanes. Reverse with the Greek legend: ΒΑΣΙΛΕΩΣ ΑΝΤΙΟΧΟΥ ΘΕΟΥ ΕΠΙΦΑΝΟΥΣ ΝΙΚΗΦΟΡΟΥ, Basileōs Antiochou Theou Epiphanous Nikēphorou, "of Victorious God Manifest King Antiochus."

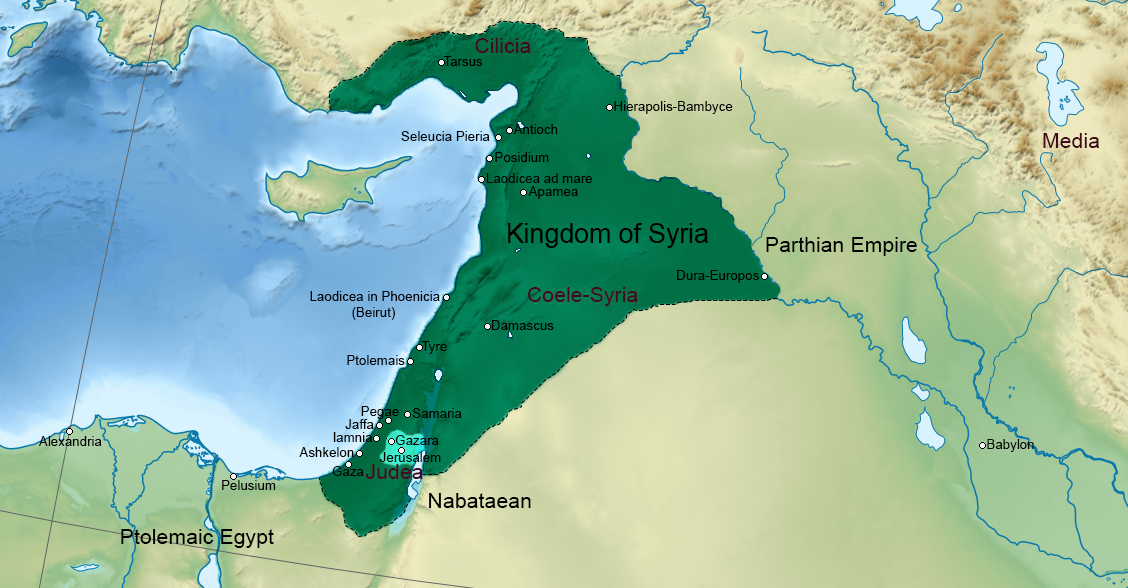
Seleucid Syria in early 124 BC under Alexander II Zabinas, who ruled the country with the exception of the city of Ptolemais

After the death of Antiochus IV Epiphanes, the Seleucid Empire became increasingly unstable. Frequent civil wars made central authority tenuous at best. Epiphanes' young son, Antiochus V Eupator, was first overthrown by Seleucus IV's son, Demetrius I Soter in 161 BC. Demetrius I attempted to restore Seleucid power in Judea particularly, but was overthrown in 150 BC by Alexander Balas—an impostor who (with Egyptian backing) claimed to be the son of Epiphanes. Alexander Balas reigned until 145 BC when he was overthrown by Demetrius I's son, Demetrius II Nicator. Demetrius II proved unable to control the whole of the kingdom, however. While he ruled Babylonia and eastern Syria from Damascus, the remnants of Balas' supporters—first supporting Balas' son Antiochus VI, then the usurping general Diodotus Tryphon—held out in Antioch.

Meanwhile, the decay of the Empire's territorial possessions continued apace. By 143 BC, the Jews in the form of the Maccabees had fully established their independence. Parthian expansion continued as well. In 139 BC, Demetrius II was defeated in battle by the Parthians and was captured. By this time, the entire Iranian Plateau had been lost to Parthian control.

Demetrius Nicator's brother, Antiochus VII Sidetes, took the throne after his brother's capture. He faced the enormous task of restoring a rapidly crumbling empire, one facing threats on multiple fronts. Hard-won control of Coele-Syria was threatened by the Jewish Maccabee rebels. Once-vassal dynasties in Armenia, Cappadocia, and Pontus were threatening Syria and northern Mesopotamia; the nomadic Parthians, brilliantly led by Mithridates I of Parthia, had overrun upland Media (home of the famed Nisean horse herd); and Roman intervention was an ever-present threat. Sidetes managed to bring the Maccabees to heel and frighten the Anatolian dynasts into a temporary submission; then, in 133, he turned east with the full might of the Royal Army (supported by a body of Jews under the Hasmonean prince, John Hyrcanus) to drive back the Parthians.

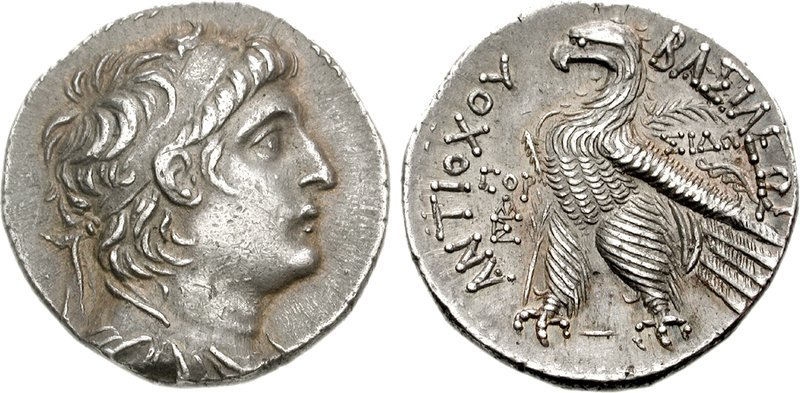
Coin of Antiochus VII Sidetes from the Sidon mint. With the Eagle of Zeus on the reverse.

Sidetes' campaign initially met with spectacular success, recapturing Mesopotamia, Babylonia, and Media. In the winter of 130/129 BC, his army was scattered in winter quarters throughout Media and Babylonia, when the Parthian king, Phraates II, counter-attacked. Moving to intercept the Parthians with only the troops at his immediate disposal, he was ambushed and killed in 129 BC. Antiochus Sidetes is sometimes called the last great Seleucid king.

After the death of Antiochus VII Sidetes, all of the recovered eastern territories were recaptured by the Parthians. The Maccabees again rebelled, civil war soon tore the empire to pieces, and the Armenians began to encroach on Syria from the north.

=== Collapse (100–63 BC) ===
Main polities in Asia, circa -100

Seleucid Kingdom in 87 BC

By 100 BC, the once-formidable Seleucid Empire encompassed little more than Antioch and some Syrian cities. Despite the clear collapse of their power, and the decline of their kingdom around them, nobles continued to play kingmakers on a regular basis, with occasional intervention from Ptolemaic Egypt and other outside powers. The Seleucids existed solely because no other nation wished to absorb them—seeing as they constituted a useful buffer between their other neighbours. In the wars in Anatolia between Mithridates VI of Pontus and Sulla of Rome, the Seleucids were largely left alone by both major combatants.

Mithridates' ambitious son-in-law, Tigranes the Great, king of Armenia, however, saw opportunity for expansion in the constant civil strife to the south. In 83 BC, at the invitation of one of the factions in the interminable civil wars, he invaded Syria and soon established himself as ruler of Syria, putting the Seleucid Empire virtually at an end.

Seleucid rule was not entirely over, however. Following the Roman general Lucullus' defeat of both Mithridates and Tigranes in 69 BC, a rump Seleucid kingdom was restored under Antiochus XIII. Even so, civil wars could not be prevented, as another Seleucid, Philip II, contested rule with Antiochus. After the Roman conquest of Pontus, the Romans became increasingly alarmed at the constant source of instability in Syria under the Seleucids. Once Mithridates was defeated by Pompey in 63 BC, Pompey set about the task of remaking the Hellenistic East, by creating new client kingdoms and establishing provinces. While client nations like Armenia and Judea were allowed to continue with some degree of autonomy under local kings, Pompey saw the Seleucids as too troublesome to continue; doing away with both rival Seleucid princes, he made Syria into a Roman province.

== Culture ==
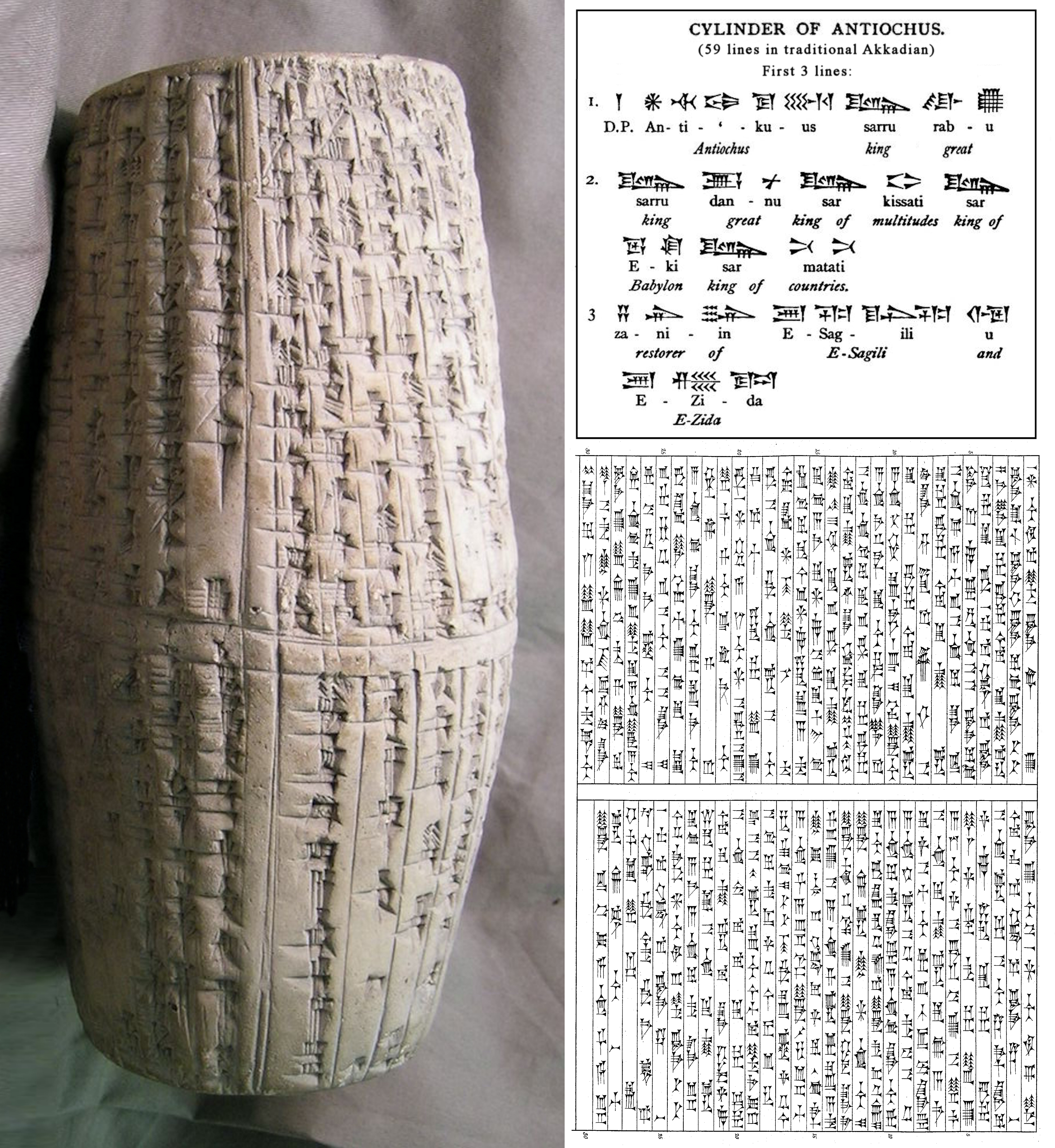
The Antiochus Cylinder written in Akkadian cuneiform c. 250 BC, mentioning Antiochus I, son of Seleucus I "the Macedonian", who restored the temples of Esagila and Ezida in Babylon.

The domain of the Seleucids stretched from the Aegean Sea to what is now Afghanistan and Pakistan, therefore including a diverse array of cultures and ethnic groups. Greeks, Assyrians, Armenians, Georgians, Persians, Medes, Mesopotamians, Jews, and more all lived within its bounds. The immense size of the empire gave the Seleucid rulers a difficult balancing act to maintain order, resulting in a mixture of concessions to local cultures to maintain their own practices while also firmly controlling and unifying local elites under the Seleucid banner.

The government established Greek cities and settlements throughout the empire via a program of colonization that encouraged immigration from Greece; both city settlements as well as rural ones were created that were inhabited by ethnic Greeks. These Greeks were given good land and privileges, and in exchange were expected to serve in military service for the state. Despite being a tiny minority of the overall population, these Greeks were the backbone of the empire: loyal and committed to a cause that gave them vast territory to rule, they overwhelmingly served in the military and government. Unlike Ptolemaic Egypt, Greeks in the Seleucid Empire seem to rarely have engaged in mixed marriages with non-Greeks; they kept to their own cities.

The various non-Greek peoples of the empire were still influenced by the spread of Greek thought and culture, a phenomenon referred to as Hellenization. Historically significant towns and cities, such as Antioch, were created or renamed with Greek names, and hundreds of new cities were established for trade purposes and built in Greek style from the start. Local educated elites who needed to work with the government learned the Greek language, wrote in Greek, absorbed Greek philosophical ideas, and took on Greek names; some of these practices then slowly filtered down to the lower classes. Hellenic ideas began an almost 250-year expansion into the Near East, Middle East, and Central Asian cultures.

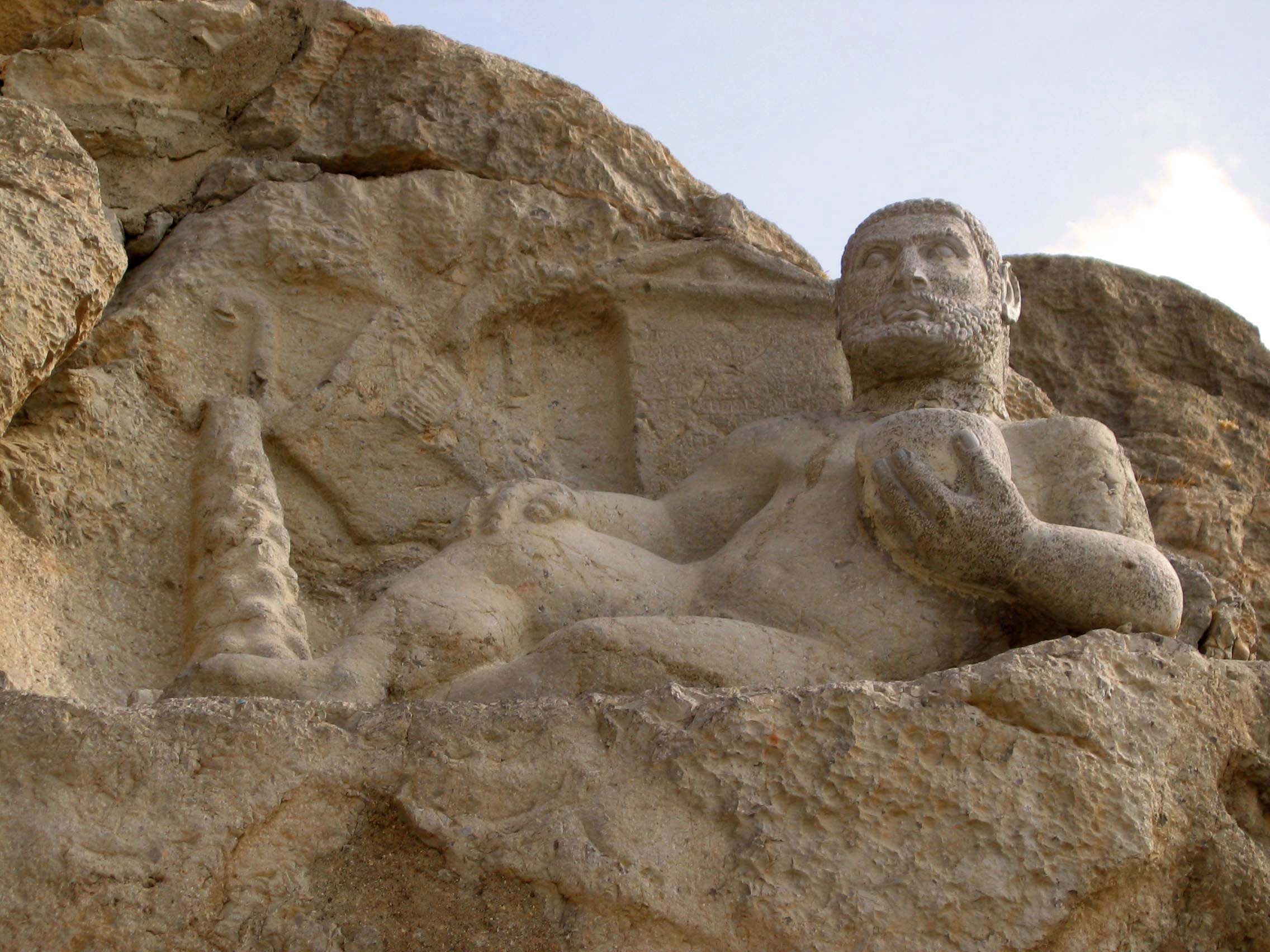
Statue of Heracles Callinicus at Behistun, made for a Seleucid governor named Cleomenes in about 148 BC.

Synthesizing Hellenic and indigenous cultural, religious, and philosophical ideas – an ethnic unity framework established by Alexander – met with varying degrees of success. The result was times of simultaneous peace and rebellion in various parts of the empire. In general, the Seleucids allowed local religions to operate undisturbed, such as incorporating Babylonian religious tenets, to gain support. Tensions around the integration of Judaism were present during the reign of the Seleucid governments. Though previous governments had managed a relatively seamless integration of Judean religious and cultural practices, the rule of Antiochus IV introduced significant changes. Antiochus IV instigated a bidding process for the High Priest position—this led to Menelaus, a radical Hellenist, outbidding Jason, a moderate Hellenist who upheld many traditional Judean practices. The shift from Jason to Menelaus unsettled the Jewish populace due to Menelaus's more extreme Hellenistic leanings. Aggravating the situation, Antiochus IV initiated a series of religious persecutions. This cumulated in a localized revolt in Jerusalem. Antiochus IV's violent retaking of the city and the banning of traditional Judean practices led to the eventual loss of control of Judea by the Seleucid government, paving the way for the rise of an independent Hasmonean kingdom.

== Military ==
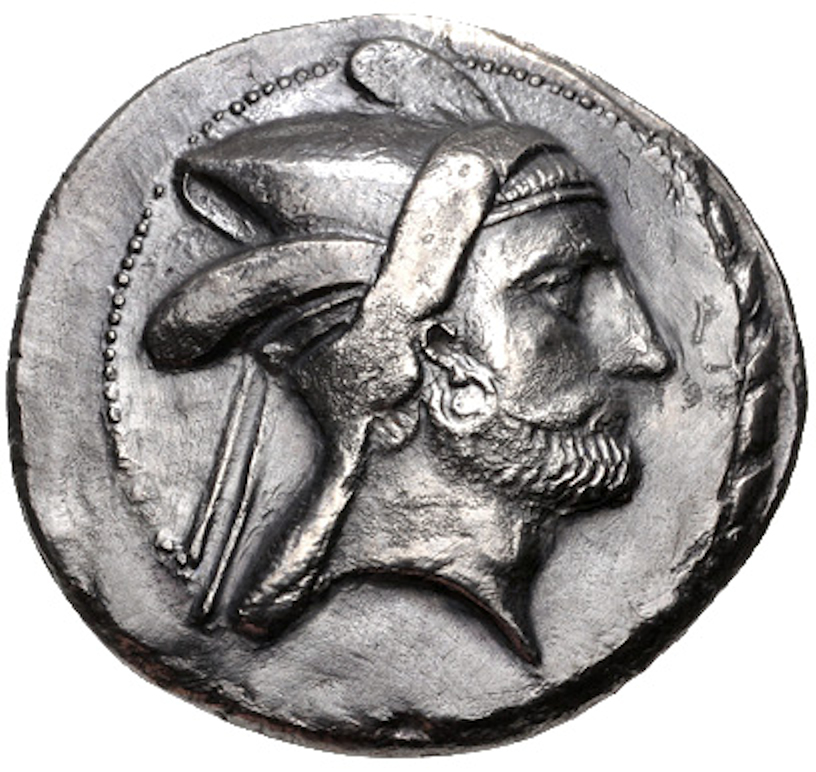
Bagadates I (Minted 290–280 BC) was the first native Seleucid satrap to be appointed.

As with the other major Hellenistic armies, the Seleucid army fought primarily in the Greco-Macedonian style, with its main body being the phalanx. The phalanx was a large, dense formation of men armed with small shields and a long pike called the sarissa. This form of fighting had been developed by the Macedonian army in the reign of Philip II of Macedon and his son Alexander the Great. Alongside the phalanx, the Seleucid armies used numerous native and mercenary troops to supplement their Greek forces, which were limited due to the distance from the Seleucid rulers' Macedonian homeland. The size of the Seleucid army usually varied between 70,000 and 200,000 in manpower.

The distance from Greece put a strain on the Seleucid military system, as it was primarily based around the recruitment of Greeks as the key segment of the army. In order to increase the population of Greeks in their kingdom, the Seleucid rulers created military settlements. There were two main periods in the establishment of settlements, firstly under Seleucus I Nicator and Antiochus I Soter and then under Antiochus IV Epiphanes. The military settlers were given land, "varying in size according to rank and arm of service'. They were settled in 'colonies of an urban character, which at some point could acquire the status of a polis". The settler-soldiers were called katoikoi; they would maintain the land as their own and in return, they would serve in the Seleucid army when called. The majority of settlements were concentrated in Lydia, northern Syria, the upper Euphrates and Media. Antiochus III brought Greeks from Euboea, Crete and Aetolia and settled them in Antioch.

These Greek settlers would be used to form the Seleucid phalanx and cavalry units, with picked men put into the kingdom's guards' regiments. The rest of the Seleucid army would consist of native and mercenary troops, who would serve as light auxiliary troops. While the Seleucids were happy to recruit from less populated and outlying parts of the Empire such as the Arabs and Jews, Iranian peoples in the east, and inhabitants of Asia Minor to the north, they generally eschewed recruiting native Syrians and native Mesopotamians (Babylonians). This was presumably mostly from a desire not to train and arm the people who were an overwhelming majority in the trade and governmental centers of the Empire in Antioch and Babylon, risking revolt. While a revolt in a remote place could be put down by resolute action from the center, an uprising in Syria-Coele would have undermined the kingdom's very existence.

Following losses of territory in Asia Minor during the Roman-Seleucid War, King Antiochus IV sponsored a new wave of immigration and settlements to replace them and maintain enough Greeks to staff the phalanxes seen at the military parade at Daphne in 166–165 BC. Antiochus IV built 15 new cities "and their association with the increased phalanx... at Daphne is too obvious to be ignored".

== Economy ==
As a hegemonic empire, much of the state's wealth accumulation centered around maintaining its sizable military. While the motive is simple enough, the Seleucid Empire boasts of a sophisticated political economy that extracts wealth from local temples, cities (or poleis), and royal estates; much of which was inherited from their Achaemenid predecessors. Recent discussion indicates a market-oriented economy under the Seleucids. However, evidencing limits our understanding of the Seleucid economy to the Hellenistic Near-East; that is, through their holdings in Syria, Asia Minor, and Mesopotamia. Little is known about the economy of the Upper Satrapies.

=== Monetization ===
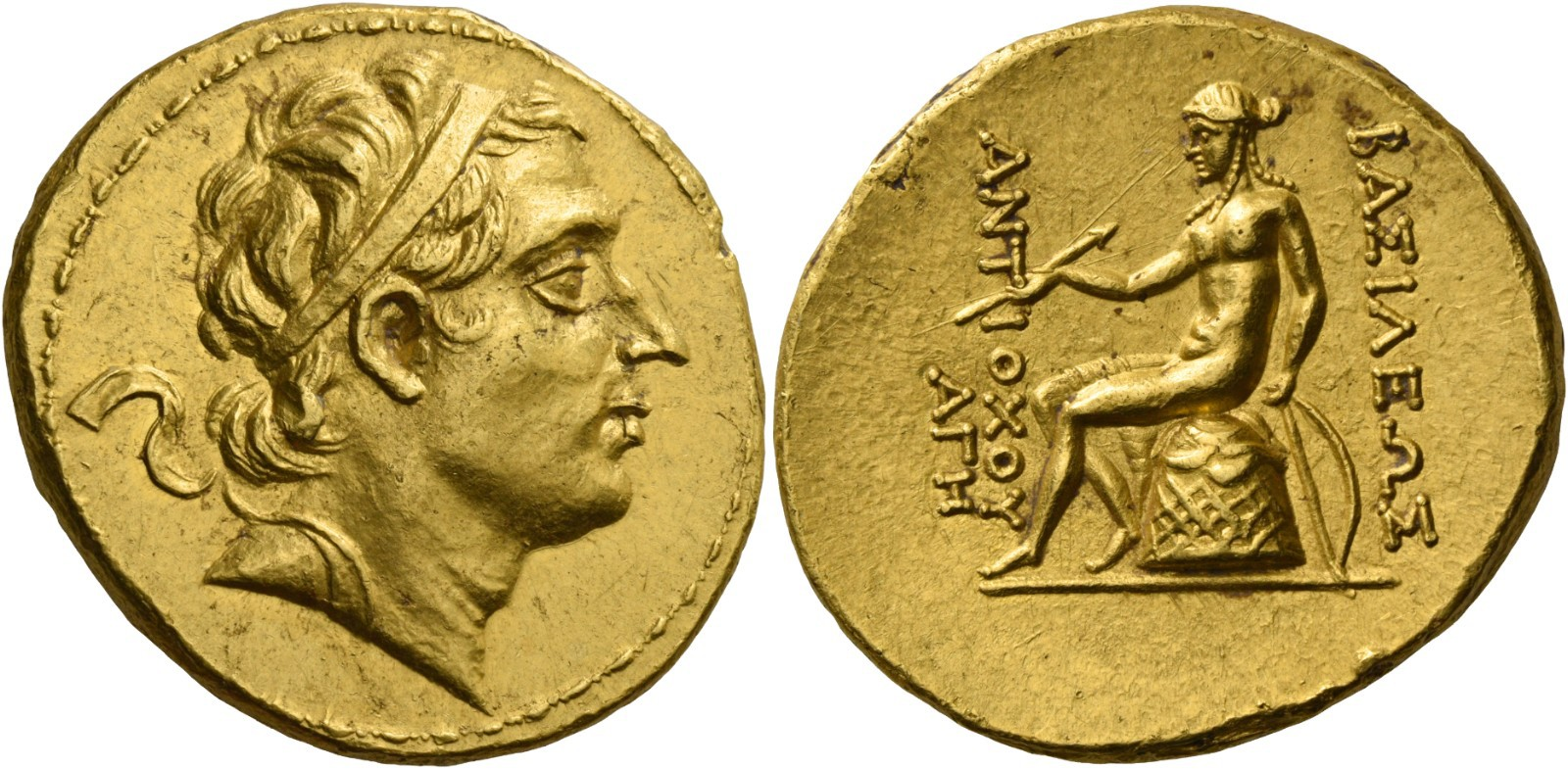
Gold octodrachm of Antiochus III; Antioch mint 204-197 BC.

Currency plays an increasingly central role under the Seleucids; however, monetization was nothing new in their newly acquired lands. Rather, the introduction and widespread implementation of currency is attributed to Darius I's tax reforms centuries prior; hence, the Seleucids see a continuation rather than shift in this practice, i.e. the payment of taxation in silver or, if necessary, in kind. In this regard, the Seleucids are notable for paying their sizeable armies exclusively in silver. Nevertheless, there are two significant developments of currency during the Seleucid period: the adoption of the "Attic Standard" in certain regions, and the popularization of bronze coinage.

The adoption of the Attic standard was not uniform across the realm. The Attic standard was already the common currency of the Mediterranean prior to Alexander's conquest; that is, it was the preferred currency for foreign transactions. As a result, coastal regions under the Seleucids—Syria and Asia Minor—were quick to adopt the new standard. In Mesopotamia, however, the millennia-old shekel (weighing 8.33 g silver) prevailed over the Attic standard. According to Historian R. J. van der Spek, this is due to their particular method in recording price, which favored bartering over monetary transactions. The Mesopotamians used the value of one shekel as a fixed reference point, against which the amount of a good is given. Prices themselves are accounted in terms of their weight in silver per ton, e.g., 60 g silver, barley, June 242 BC. The minute difference in weight between a shekel and didrachm (weighing 8.6 g silver) could not be expressed in this barter system, and a Greek tetradrachm would be "a far too heavy denomination...in daily trade."

Bronze coinage, dating from the late fifth and fourth century, was popularized as a "fiduciary" currency facilitating "small-scale exchanges" in the Hellenistic period. It was principally a legal tender which circulated only around its locales of production; however, the great Seleucid mint at Antioch during Antiochus III's reign (which Numismatist Arthur Houghton dubs "The Syrian and Coele-Syrian Experiment") began minting bronze coins (weighing 1.25–1.5g) to serve a "regional purpose." The reasons behind this remain unclear. However, Spek notes a chronic shortage of silver in the Seleucid empire. In fact, Antiochus I's heavy withdrawal of silver from a satrap is noted by the Babylonian astronomical diaries (AD No. – 273 B 'Rev. 33'): "purchases in Babylon and other cities were made in Greek bronze coins." This was unprecedented because "in official documents [bronze coins] played no part"; it was a sign of "hardship" for the Seleucids. Nevertheless, the low denomination of bronze coinage meant it was used in tandem with bartering; making it a popular and successful medium of exchange.

=== Agriculture ===
Agriculture, like most pre-modern economies, constituted a vast majority of the Seleucid economy. Somewhere between 80 and 90% of the Seleucid population was employed, in some form, within the prevailing agricultural structures inherited from their Neo-Babylonian and Achaemenid predecessors. These included temples, poleis, and royal estates. We should clarify that the term poleis, according to Spek, did not confer any special status to cities in the Seleucid sources; it was simply the term for "city"—Greek or otherwise. Regardless, agricultural produce varied from region to region. But in general, Greek poleis produced: "grain, olives and their oil, wine...figs, cheese from sheep and goats, [and] meat." Whereas Mesopotamian production from temple land consisted of: "barley, dates, mustard (or cascuta/dodder), cress (cardamom), sesame and wool"; which, as the core region of the Seleucid empire, was also the most productive. Recent evidence indicates that Mesopotamian grain production, under the Seleucids, was subject to market forces of supply and demand. Traditional "primitivist" narratives of the ancient economy argue that it was "marketless"; however, the Babylonian astronomical diaries show a high degree of market integration of barley and date prices—to name a few—in Seleucid Babylonia. Prices exceeding 370g silver per ton in Seleucid Mesopotamia was considered a sign of famine. Therefore, during periods of war, heavy taxation, and crop failure, prices increase drastically. In an extreme example, Spek believes tribal Arab raiding into Babylonia caused barley prices to skyrocket to 1493 grams of silver per ton from 5–8 May, 124 BC. The average Mesopotamian peasant, if working for a wage at a temple, would receive 1 shekel; it "was a reasonable monthly wage for which one could buy one kor of grain= 180 [liters]." While this appears dire, we should be reminded that Mesopotamia under the Seleucids was largely stable and prices remained low. With encouraged Greek colonization and land reclamation increasing the supply of grain production, however, the question of whether this artificially kept prices stable is uncertain.

The Seleucids also continued the tradition of actively maintaining the Mesopotamian waterways. As the greatest source of state income, the Seleucid kings actively managed the irrigation, reclamation, and population of Mesopotamia. In fact, canals were often dug by royal decrees, to which "some were called the King's Canal for that reason." For example, the construction of the Pallacottas canal was able to control the water level of the Euphrates which, as Arrian notes in his Anabasis 7.21.5, required: "over two months of work by more than 10,000 Assyrians."

=== Role of the state–political economy ===
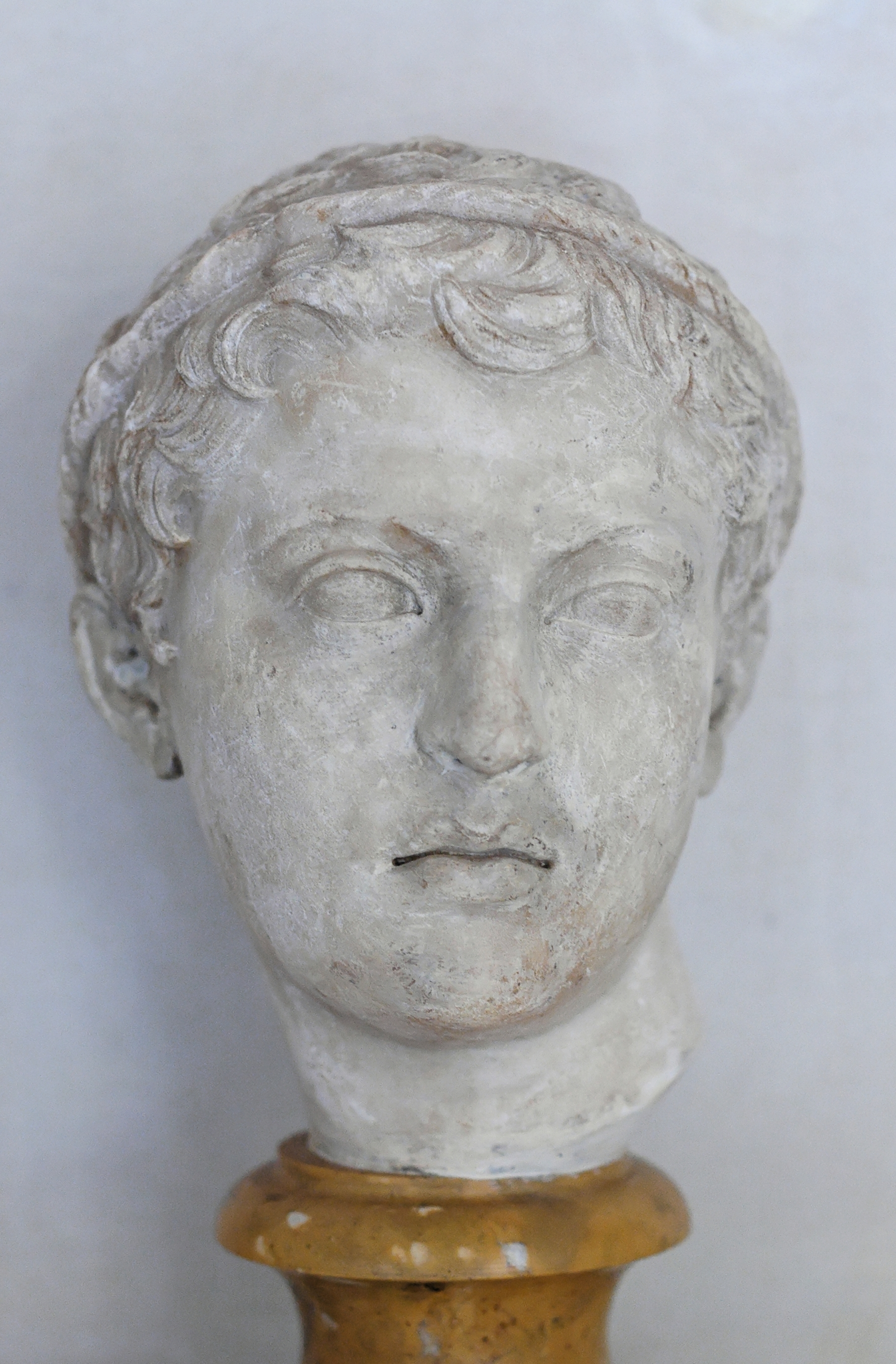
Portrait of a young Seleucid prince. Marble, 2nd century BC.

As a hegemonic empire, the state's primary focus was maintaining its sizable army via wealth extraction from three major sources: tribute from autonomous poleis and temples, and proportional land-tax from royal land. The definition of "royal land" remains contested. While all agree poleis do not constitute royal land, some remain uncertain over the status of temple land. Yet, they commanded notable economic power and functioned almost independently from the state. Nevertheless, the Seleucid manner of extraction, in contrast to earlier regimes, is considered more "aggressive" and "predatory". In theory, the Seleucid state was an absolute monarchy that did not recognize private property in our modern sense. Any land that was not delegated to the poleis or temples was considered private property of the sovereign; thus, considered as Royal Land and liable to direct tax by the state. Here, a "proportional land-tax", that is, a tax based on the size of one's plot, is collected by the local governor (or Satrap) and sent to the capital. However, there is no evidence for the amount that was taxed on any given region.

Tribute was heavily levied on poleis and temples. Although tribute is paid annually, the amount demanded increases significantly during wartime. During a civil war in 149 BC, Demetrius II demanded the province of Judaea to pay 300 talents of silver, which was seen as "severe." But this was far from an isolated case. In fact, the Babylonian Astronomical Diaries in 308/7 BC note a hefty 50% tax on harvest "from the lands of the temple of Shamash (in Sipprar or Larsa)." Nevertheless, annual tribute was "a long-accepted and uncontroversial practice." Also, royal land was regularly donated to the temples and poleis; albeit under the assumption that a greater share of revenue is given to the state in exchange.

The controversial practice of temple "despoliation", however, was a regular occurrence under the Seleucids—in contrast to earlier times. Although the Seleucid kings were aware and appreciated the sacrosanctity of religious treasures, their concentration in these places "proved irresistible" in the face of "short-term fiscal constraints." As an example, Antiochus III's despoliation of the Anahit Temple in Ecbatana, wherein he procured 4000 silver talents, was used to fund his Great Eastern campaign. According to historian Michael J. Taylor:

It is difficult to believe that these monarchs who knew enough to bow before Nabu, bake bricks for Esagil, and enforce kosher regulations in Jerusalem, would be blithely aware of the political hazards of removing Temple treasures. It is more likely that they knew the risks but took them anyway.

A rebellion in 169 BC during Antiochus III's campaign in Egypt demonstrates that these "risks" occasionally backfire. The increasingly bold interference is due, in large part, to the appointment of provincial high-priests by the monarch himself. Often they were his court "favorites", whose prerogatives were purely administrative; essentially, they served to collect tribute for the state. Unsurprisingly: "native elites profoundly feared that the arrival of a Seleucid official might quickly cascade into a wholesale removal of Temple treasures."

=== Academic discussion ===
Interpretations on the Seleucid economy since the late 19th century traditionally fell between the "modernist" and "primitivist" camps. On one hand, the modernist view—largely associated with Michael Rostovtzeff and Eduard Meyer—argues that the Hellenistic economies operated along price-setting markets with capitalist enterprises exported over long distances in "completely monetarized markets." On the other hand, the primitivist view—associated with M.I. Finley, Karl Polanyi and Karl Bücher—interprets ancient economies as "autarchic" in nature with little to no interaction among each other. However, recent discussion has since criticized these models for their grounding on "Greco-centric" sources.

Recent discussion has since rejected these traditional dichotomies. According to Spek and Reger, the current view is that the Seleucid economy—and Hellenistic economies more broadly—were partially market-oriented, and partially monetarized. While the market was subject to forces of supply and demand, a majority of produce was still consumed by their producers and was, hence, "invisible" to the observer.

== See also ==
- Seleucid army
- Seleucid dynasty
- Hellenistic period
- Greco-Bactrian Kingdom
- Hasmonean Judea
- Indo-Greek Kingdom
- Parthian Empire
- Cilician pirates

== Sources ==
- Baskin, Judith R.; Seeskin, Kenneth (2010). The Cambridge Guide to Jewish History, Religion, and Culture. Cambridge University Press. ISBN 978-0-521-68974-8.
- Debevoise, Neilson C. (1938). A Political History of Parthia. University of Chicago Press.
- Eckstein, Arthur M. (2009). Mediterranean Anarchy, Interstate War, and the Rise of Rome. University of California Press. ISBN 978-0-520-25992-8.
- Glubb, John Bagot (1967). Syria, Lebanon, Jordan. Thames & Hudson. p. 34. OCLC 585939.
- Grainger, John D. (2020) [1st pub. 2015]. The Seleucid Empire of Antiochus III. 223–187 BC (Paperback ed.). Barnsley: Pen and Sword. ISBN 978-1-52677-493-4.
- Jansari, Sushma (2023). Chandragupta Maurya: The creation of a national hero in India. UCL Press.
- Jones, Kenneth Raymond (2006). Provincial reactions to Roman imperialism: the aftermath of the Jewish revolt, A.D. 66–70, Parts 66–70. University of California, Berkeley. ISBN 978-0-542-82473-9.
- Keay, John (2018) [2000]. India: A History. Harper Perennial. p. 84. ISBN 978-0006387848.
- Kosmin, Paul J. (2014). The Land of the Elephant Kings: Space, Territory, and Ideology in Seleucid Empire. Harvard University Press. ISBN 978-0-674-72882-0.
- Niknami, Kamal-Aldin; Hozhabri, Ali (2020). Archaeology of Iran in the Historical Period. Springer. ISBN 978-3-030-41776-5.
- Overtoom, Nikolaus Leo (2020). Reign of Arrows: The Rise of the Parthian Empire in the Hellenistic Middle East. Oxford University Press. ISBN 9780190888336.
- Shayegan, M. Rahim (2011). Arsacids and Sasanians: Political Ideology in Post-Hellenistic and Late Antique Persia. Cambridge University Press. ISBN 9780521766418.
- Sherwin-White, Susan; Kuhrt, Amelie (1993). From Samarkhand to Sardis: A New Approach to the Seleucid Empire. London: Duckworth. ISBN 978-0-520-08183-3.
- Wheatley, Pat; Heckel, Waldemar (2011), ""Commentary (Book 15)"", Justin: Epitome of the Philippic History of Pompeius Trogus: Volume II, Oxford University Press, ISBN 978-0-19-927759-9
- Society for the Promotion of Hellenic Studies (1993). The Journal of Hellenic studies, Volumes 113–114. London: Society for the Promotion of Hellenic Studies.
