= Tang-e Sarvak =

- تنگ سروک (Persian)
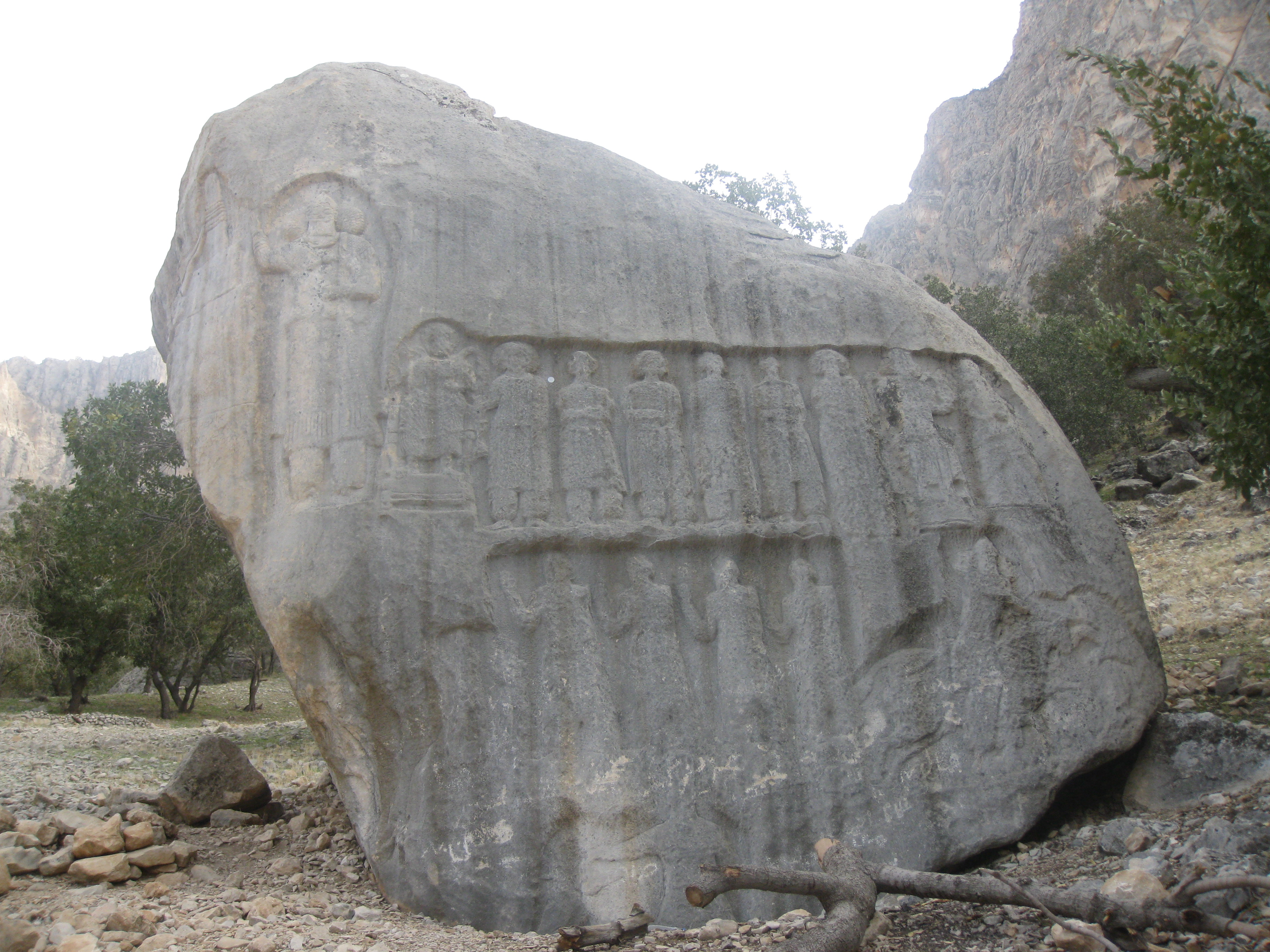
- The second panel, which depicts an investiture scene

- Location of Tang-e Sarvak in Iran
- 31.01027°N 50.17216°E
- Type: Rock relief
- Periods: Late antiquity
- Location: Khuzestan Province, Iran

Tang-e Sarvak (also spelled Tang-i Sarvak; Persian: تنگ سروک, "Gorge of the cypresses") is a Parthian-era archeological site located in the Khuzestan Province, southwestern Iran. The site is made up of four panels.

== Inscriptions ==
The site has 2nd-century Aramaic inscriptions that resemble Mandaic letters.

== See also ==
- Parthian bas-relief at Mydan Mishan

== Sources ==
- Haerinck, Ernie (2005). "Tang-e Sarvak". Encyclopaedia Iranica.
- Kawami, Trudy S. (2013). "Parthian and Elymaean Rock Reliefs". In Potts, Daniel T. (ed.). The Oxford Handbook of Ancient Iran. Oxford University Press. ISBN 978-0199733309.
