= List of Greco-Persian Wars =

The following is a list of wars fought between Greeks and Persians.

Greek/Seleucid/Byzantine victory

Persian/Parthian/Sasanian victory

Inconclusive

== Ancient Greece-persia ==
Date	War	Belligerents	Belligerents	Result	Note
(499–323 BC)
499–493 BC	Ionian Revolt	Greeks	Achaemenid Empire	Persian victory	Persia regains control of Cyprus and Greek cities in Asia Minor Beginning of the first Persian invasion of Greece
492–490 BC	First Persian invasion of Greece	Greeks	Achaemenid Empire	Persian Strategic victory	Persians conquered Macedon and Eretria and the Cycladic Islands and other islands, suppressed the Ionian Revolt, re-subjugates Thrace, and establishes naval supremacy over the Aegean Sea, but only failed to conquer Attica Sparta and Athens remain independent
480–479 BC	Second Persian invasion of Greece	Greeks	Achaemenid Empire	Greek victory	Greeks expel Persia from Greece; Macedon, Thrace, Ionia and Aegean Islands returned to Greeks
479–478 BC	Greek counterattack	Greeks	Achaemenid Empire	Greek victory	
477-442 BC	Wars of the Delian League	Greeks	Achaemenid Empire	Inconclusive	Complete expulsion of the Achaemenid Empire from Europe; The Failure of the Greeks in Egypt; Autonomy of the Greek cities in Ionia
395–387 BC	Corinthian War	greeks	acheamenid empire-greeks	Inconclusive (achaemenid political victory)	Western coast of Anatolia, lonian and islands of Clazomenae and Cyprus ceded to Persia and Boeotian league dissolved union of argos and corinth dissolved.
355–328 BC	Persian campaign of Alexander the Great	Macedonian Empire	Achaemenid Empire	Greek victory	Macedon annexes Achaemenid Empire Start of the Hellenistic period

== Seleucidih Empire and Greco-Bactrian Kingdom-parthian empire ==
Date	War	Belligerents	Belligerents	Result	Note
(312–129 BC)
280 BC	First Parni invasion of Margiana	Seleucid Empire	Parni	Seleucid victory	The military capabilities of the Parni had been weakened as a result of the Seleucid retaliation and victory.
248–246 BC	Second Parni invasion of Margiana	Seleucid Empire	Parni	Seleucid victory	Despite the victory, the Seleucids once again failed to completely neutralize the Parni threat.
236–235 BC	First Seleucid-Parthian war	Seleucid Empire	Parthian Empire	Parthian victory	that Seleucus was forced to acquiesce to Arsaces and leave Parthia to its devices
210–208 BC	Second Seleucid-Parthian war	Seleucid Empire	Parthian Empire	Seleucid victory	Parthia becomes a vassal of the Seleucid Empire. The Seleucids annex all of Parthia south of the Kopetdag mountain range
187–166 BC	Third Seleucid–Parthian War	Seleucid Empire	Parthian Empire	Parthian victory	Parthia gains independence from the Seleucids
165–138 BC	Fourth Seleucid–Parthian War	Seleucid Empire	Parthian Empire	Parthian victory	Parthia captures a large territory in the east and captures the Seleucid Emperor
150 BC	Parthian–Bactrian War	Greco-Bactrian Kingdom	Parthian Empire	Parthian victory	Decline of the Greco-Bactrian Kingdom
148–129 BC	Fifth Seleucid–Parthian War	Seleucid Empire	Parthian Empire	Parthian victory	Decline of the Seleucids, and end of the Hellenistic rule in Iran

== Roman-Byzantine Empire-sasanian empire ==
Date	War	Belligerents	Belligerents	Result	Note
(AD 440–628)
240–244 AD	Shapur I's first Roman campaign	roman empire	sasanian empire	Sasanian victory	The Sasanian Empire conquers Armenia and Mesopotamia
252–256	Shapur I's second Roman campaign	roman empire	sasanian empire	sasanian victory	The Sasanian empire conquers Nisibis and Emesa and more than 35 cities, including Dura Europos
260	Battle of Edessa	3 roman empire	sasanian empire	sasanian victory	-
337–361	Perso-Roman wars of 337–361	roman empire	sasanian empire	sasanian strategic victory	-
March–July 363 AD	Julian's Persian expedition	roman empire	sasanian empire	Sasanian victory	Sasanian annexation of five regions and fifteen major fortresses from the Roman Empire in addition to the consequent annexation of Armenia
421–422	Byzantine-Sasanian War of 421–422	Byzantine Empire	Sasanian Empire	Disputed	Status quo ante bellum: Sasanians stop persecuting Christians on their territory
440	Byzantine–Sasanian War of 440	Byzantine Empire	Sasanian Empire	Inconclusive	Status quo ante bellum: Both empires agreed to battle northern nomads (Vandals).
502–506	Anastasian War	Byzantine Empire	Sasanian Empire	Inconclusive	Status quo ante bellum: Although Byzantium paid a very small amount of money, the Sassanians were forced to retreat without achieving the goals of the war, the tribute that the Persian king wanted to receive from the Romans was not paid Byzantine Empire creates a new line of fortifications contrary to the treaty of 422
526–532	Iberian War	Byzantine Empire	Sasanian Empire	Inconclusive	Sasanians retained Iberia, Byzantines retained Lazica
541–562	Lazic War	Byzantine Empire	Sasanian Empire	Inconclusive	Fifty-Year Peace Treaty
572–591	Byzantine–Sasanian War of 572–591	Byzantine Empire	Sasanian Empire	Byzantine victory	Khosrow II restored to the Sasanian throne, Byzantine Empire get most of Sasanian Armenia and western half of Iberia
614	Sasanian conquest of Jerusalem	byzantine empire	sasanian empire	Sasanian victory	Jerusalem and Palaestina Prima annexed by the Sasanian Empire
615	Shahin's invasion of Asia Minor (615)	byzantine empire	sasanian empire	sasanian victory	Territories east of Constantinople fell under the Sasanians
618–621	Sasanian conquest of Egypt	byzantine empire	Sasanian empire	Sasanian victory	Egypt annexed by the Sasanian Empire
602–628	Byzantine–Sasanian War of 602–628	Byzantine Empire	Sasanian Empire	Byzantine victory	Status quo ante bellum: Political and economic crisis of the Sassanids; Sasanian Empire coughs up all the damage it has done to the Byzantine Empire; Beginning of the Arab conquest of Persia

== See also ==
- Byzantine–Sasanian Wars
- Greco-Persian Wars

== Sources ==
- Greatrex, Geoffrey (1991). The Roman Eastern Frontier and the Persian wars.Part II.363-630AD. Routledge. ISBN 0-415-14687-9.
- Decker, Michael J. (2022). The Sasanian empire at War.Persia,Rome and the rise od Islam. Westholme Publishing,LLC. ISBN 978-1-59416-692-1.
