= 238 BC =

238 BC in various calendars
Gregorian calendar	238 BC; CCXXXVIII BC
Ab urbe condita	516
Ancient Egypt era	XXXIII dynasty, 86
Pharaoh	Ptolemy III Euergetes, 9
Ancient Greek Olympiad (summer)	135th Olympiad, year 3
Assyrian calendar	4513
Balinese saka calendar	N/A
Bengali calendar	−831 – −830
Berber calendar	713
Buddhist calendar	307
Burmese calendar	−875
Byzantine calendar	5271–5272
Chinese calendar	壬戌年 (Water Dog); 2460 or 2253 — to — 癸亥年 (Water Pig); 2461 or 2254
Coptic calendar	−521 – −520
Discordian calendar	929
Ethiopian calendar	−245 – −244
Hebrew calendar	3523–3524
- Hindu calendars
Vikram Samvat	−181 – −180
Shaka Samvat	N/A
Kali Yuga	2863–2864
Holocene calendar	9763
Iranian calendar	859 BP – 858 BP
Islamic calendar	885 BH – 884 BH
Javanese calendar	N/A
Julian calendar	N/A
Korean calendar	2096
Minguo calendar	2149 before ROC 民前2149年
Nanakshahi calendar	−1705
Seleucid era	74/75 AG
Thai solar calendar	305–306
Tibetan calendar	ཆུ་ཕོ་ཁྱི་ལོ་ (male Water-Dog) −111 or −492 or −1264 — to — ཆུ་མོ་ཕག་ལོ་ (female Water-Boar) −110 or −491 or −1263

Year 238 BC was a year of the pre-Julian Roman calendar. At the time it was known as the Year of the Consulship of Gracchus and Falto (or, less frequently, year 516 Ab urbe condita). The denomination 238 BC for this year has been used since the early medieval period, when the Anno Domini calendar era became the prevalent method in Europe for naming years.

== Events ==
=== By place ===
==== Rome ====
- Rome captures Corsica and Sardinia

==== Carthage ====
- Hamilcar Barca strikes at the supply lines of the mercenary army besieging Carthage, forcing them to cease the siege of the city. He then fights a series of running engagements with the mercenary armies, keeping them off balance. Hamilcar manages to force the mercenary armies into a box canyon in the Battle of "The Saw". The mercenaries are besieged in the canyon.
- The mercenary army, under the leadership of Spendius, attempts to fight its way out of the siege but is totally defeated by the Carthaginian forces led by Hamilcar Barca. After the battle, Hamilcar executes some 40,000 rebel mercenaries.
- Hamilcar's armies capture a number of rebel Libyan cities. The Libyan settlements that have rebelled surrender to Carthage, with the exception of Utica and Hippacritae.
- Hamilcar and another Carthaginian general, Hannibal, besiege Mathos' mercenary army at Tunis and crucify the captured mercenary leaders in sight of the mercenary battlements.
- Mathos exploits a weakness in Hannibal's defenses and launches an attack against his army, capturing Hannibal and several other high ranking Carthaginians. The mercenaries then crucify the captured Carthaginian leaders.
- Carthaginian reinforcements led by Hanno the Great join the battle. They defeat Mathos' mercenary forces and Mathos is captured.
- The Carthaginian armies besiege and capture Utica and Hippacritae. This ends the Carthaginian civil war.
- The Romans declare war on the Carthaginians over which state controls Sardinia. However, Carthage defers to Rome rather than enter yet another war and gives up any claim to Sardinia.

==== Egypt ====
- The Decree of Canopus, also called "Table of Tanis", is a memorial stone promulgated by an assemblage of priests in honour of Ptolemy III Euergetes and his consort Berenice. The decree, written in Greek, demotic, and hieroglyphs is an ancient bilingual Egyptian decree that provides a key for deciphering hieroglyphic and the simpler demotic scripts.

==== Persia ====
- Arsaces, chief of an Iranian nomad tribe, the Parni, invades and conquers Parthia killing, in the process, the local ruler Andragoras.

Asia Minor

- A joint Seleucid-Galatian invasion of Pergamon is defeated at the Battle of Aphrodisium

==== China ====
- Ying Zheng, having reached adulthood, celebrates his capping ceremony as the king of Qin.
- Ying Zheng and Prime Minister Lü Buwei crush the rebellion of Lao Ai. Lao Ai is executed.

== Births ==
- Masinissa, king of Numidia (approximate date)
- Philip V, king (basileus) of Macedonia (d. 179 BC)

== Deaths ==
- Andragoras, Seleucid governor (satrap) of Parthia
- Autaritus, Gallic mercenary leader
- Chunshen, Chinese nobleman
- Hannibal, Carthaginian general
- Kaolie of Chu, Chinese king of the Chu State
- Lao Ai, Chinese eunuch and official
- Xun Zi, Chinese philosopher (approximate date)
