= Seleucid–Parthian Wars =

238 BC–129 BC series of conflicts between the Seleucid Empire and Parthia

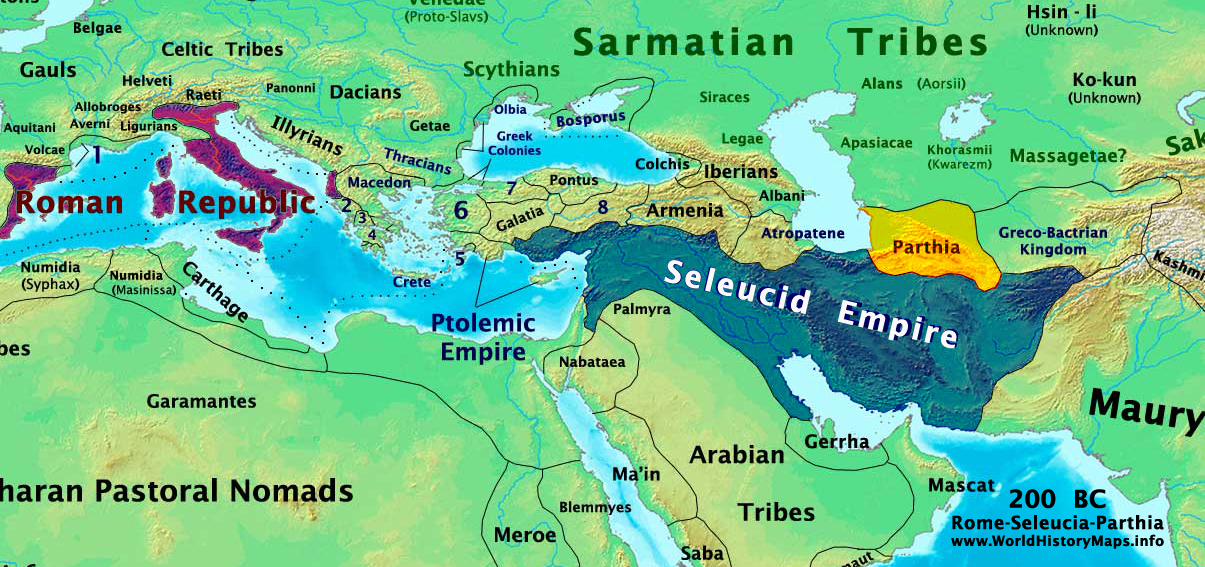
Date	238 BC – 129 BC
Location	Mesopotamia, Iran, Central Asia, Syria
Result	Parthian Victory
Territorial changes	Fall of the Seleucid Empire; End of Hellenic rule over Persia; Kingdoms of Elymais, Characene, and Persis vassalized by the Parthian Empire

Belligerents
Seleucid Empire; Elymais; Characene; Persis; Arabs	Parthian Empire

Commanders and leaders
Andragoras †; Diodotus I (WIA); Seleucus II (surrendered); Antiochus III; Demetrius I (POW); Alexander Balas (POW); Demetrius II Nicator (surrendered); Antiochus VII Sidetes †; Antiochus X †; Demetrius III (POW); Philip I (POW)	Arsaces I Arsaces II; Priapatius; Phraates I Mithridates I Phraates II; Mithridates II; Gotarzes I Mithridates III; Indates

The Seleucid–Parthian Wars were a series of conflicts between the Seleucid Empire and the Parthian Empire which resulted in the ultimate expulsion of the Seleucids from the Iranian Plateau and the surrounding regions. The wars were caused by the mass migration of the nomadic Iranian Parni tribe into Parthia and the establishment of the Parthian state, which challenged Seleucid hegemony.

== Background ==
In 323 BC, the Seleucid Empire was founded by Seleucus I Nicator, a general of Alexander the Great. Stretching from Syria to the Indus River and comprising most of Alexander's realm, the Seleucid state was the most powerful of the Diadochi kingdoms that sprang up after Alexander's death. Quickly however, the Seleucids ran into trouble trying to maintain such an extended realm, facing constant warfare against the other Hellenistic states in the west and with unrest amongst their Iranian peoples in the east.

Taking advantage of the Seleucids' preoccupation with the wars against a Celtic invasion of Asia Minor in the west, and the chaos of the Third Syrian War around 245 BC, Diodotus and Andragoras, the Seleucid satraps of Bactria and Parthia respectively, declared their remote provinces independent states. However, in around 238 BCE, the Parni, an Iranian tribe from the central Asian steppes under Arsaces, invaded Andragoras' domain, defeated and killed him, and took over the land.

== First Parni invasion of Margiana ==
Sometime in the 280s BCE, the Parni attempted to invade Seleucid Margiana in order to expand their regional power and security. The Seleucids quickly dispatched Demodamas, the satrap of Bactria and Sogdiana, to neutralize the Parni threat. Demodamas launched his campaign, defeated the Parni in Margiana, and restored Seleucid rule in the region. The military capabilities of the Parni had been weakened as a result of the Seleucid retaliation and victory; however, after Demodamas restored the territorial integrity of the Seleucids in Central Asia, he ended his campaign abruptly and failed to fully neutralize the Parni.

== Second Parni invasion of Margiana ==
The Parni had been militarily disabled for several decades as a result of Demodamas' successful campaign. Arsaces I became the king of the Parni in 248 BCE and led them on a second campaign against Seleucid Margiana in 246 BCE. Once again, a Seleucid satrap, this time Diodotus, was sent to repel the invasion. Diodotus was able to repel Arsaces I and secure Margiana. Despite the victory, the Seleucids once again failed to completely neutralize the Parni threat.

== Parni conquest of Parthia ==
In 247 BCE, the Seleucid satrap of Parthia, Andragoras revolted and declared independence in Parthia. By the early 230s BCE, Arsaces had recovered from his setback in Margiana, and in 238 BCE, he invaded the now independent Parthia. Arsaces I was able to defeat and kill Andragoras and establish a kingdom that would become the Parthian Empire. With the defeat of Andragoras, the Parthian aristocracy joined forces with the Parni to create a kingdom that was well situated for imperial expansion. Around the same time, Arsaces I attacked and successfully seized Hyrcania, incorporating it into his kingdom. The Parni began assimilating into Parthian society, adopting the language and name of the local people, thus becoming the Parthians.

== Campaign of Seleucus II Callinicus ==
Arsaces I had been successful in establishing a kingdom in Parthia; however, the Parthians still had limited resources and could expect an imminent Seleucid retaliation. Knowing this, Arsaces began levying soldiers and expanding his territory. With the Seleucid east disintegrating, a campaign to reconquer the region, secure the eastern frontier, and restore Seleucid prestige was increasingly necessary. After the death of his father, Antiochus II, in 246 BCE, Seleucus II succeeded him as ruler but was unable to respond to the Parthian threat because of an ongoing civil war with his brother, Antiochus Hierax, in the west.

Eventually, the two brothers reached a truce in 236 BCE, and Seleucus was able to begin an expedition against the Parthians in 235 BCE. Seleucus began his campaign by settling affairs in Babylonia and Media before marching on Parthia. Once Seleucus eventually reached Parthia, Arsaces withdrew into Central Asia in a calculated strategic withdrawal in the face of the Seleucid army. Arsaces' withdrawal was not a retreat or disorganized rout but rather part of a predetermined strategy to inspire overconfidence and complacency in Seleucus. Arsaces remained the master of the situation. Shortly after their withdrawal, the Parthians inflicted a major defeat on the Seleucid army, possibly even capturing Seleucus. Whatever the case may be, the Seleucids were decisively defeated, as recorded by Justin:

"and not long after, engaging with king Seleucus, who came to take vengeance on the revolters, he obtained a victory; and the Parthians observe the day on which it was gained with great solemnity, as the date of the commencement of their liberty."

— Justin, Book XVI, 41.4.9

Ammianus similarly explains thus:

After many glorious and valiant deeds, and after he [Arsaces I] had conquered Seleucus [I] Nicator [in reality, Seleucus II], successor of the said Alexander [the Great], on whom his many victories had conferred that surname, and [after Arsaces] had driven out the Macedonian [that is,

the Seleucid] garrisons [from Parthia], he passed his life in quiet peace, and was

a mild ruler and judge of his subjects."

— Ammianus, 23.6.3

Whether Seleucus was captured or not, he eventually was able to return west and resume the civil war against Antiochus Hierax. It appears that Seleucus was forced to acquiesce to Arsaces and leave Parthia to its devices. Despite their recent victory, Parthian control remained fragile.

== Campaign of Antiochus III ==
The campaign of Seleucus II had ended with the ultimate defeat of the Seleucids, but later Seleucid kings had ambitions to restore their hegemony in the east. Antiochus III the Great became king of the Seleucid Empire after his father, Seleucus II, had died in 225 BC and his brother, Seleucus III, had been assassinated in 222 BC. Antiochus faced several challenges during the initial years of his reign. He was met with the challenge of suppressing a revolt by the powerful satrap Molon, and had fought Ptolemy IV to a stalemate in the Fourth Syrian War. After matters in the west were settled, Antiochus began preparing for a campaign in the east of his empire to reconquer the newly independent states of Parthia and Bactria. There were several personal and geopolitical reasons for Antiochus' eastern campaign, namely to punish the Parthians and Bactrians, restore Seleucid hegemony in the east, and avenge his father, Seleucus II. Antiochus spent a year in Babylonia organizing his army and logistics. Antiochus had raised an army of 70,000, then set out and began marching in the spring of 209 BCE. By 210 BC, the Seleucids had entered Media and looted 4000 talents of gold and silver from the Temple of Aene in Ecbatana in order to fund their campaign. Before invading Parthia proper, Antiochus settled affairs in other parts of the empire, bringing Armenia, Media, Atropatene, Elymais, and Persia back into the Seleucid fold.

=== Situation in Parthia ===
By the time of the invasion of Antiochus III, Arsaces I had died, and the throne passed to his son, Arsaces II; however, he lacked the political and military savvy of his father. Arsaces had a tremendous military disadvantage and from the beginning of the Seleucid invasion, miscalculated and misjudged their objectives. Arsaces continued to make strategic errors, which led to his ultimate defeat.

=== The Campaign Against Parthia ===
The invasion of Parthia began with Antiochus III outmaneuvering Arsaces II by crossing a desert in western Parthia adjacent to the regions of Choarene and Komisene, which is where Arsaces had stationed his army and wrongly assumed the Seleucid army would attack from. As Arsaces realized this mistake, he attempted to rectify it by sending detachments of his army to destroy water wells in the area to slow the massive Seleucid army. Antiochus, in response, sent a general by the name of Nicomedes with a force of 1,000 cavalry to secure the wells. The Parthian units lacked the necessary strength to adequately fight the Seleucid force under Nicomedes and therefore implemented a feigned retreat to lure Nicomedes into giving chase towards the main Parthian army where it could be dealt with. Nicomedes refused to fall for the trap and did not pursue the Parthian detachments, and successfully secured the wells and drove away the Parthians. This was another major blunder on Arsaces' behalf. Arsaces had sent too few men to destroy the wells and moved too far away to support his units in need. Arsaces decided to abandon his capital, Hecatompylus, and retreat into the mountains of Hyrcania because he recognized that his army was not able to match the enormous Seleucid army. Antiochus had expected to face Arsaces in a conventional battle at Hecatompylus and wondered why Arsaces had abandoned it. Asraces' unexpected withdrawal had complicated the situation for Antiochus, who had hoped to deal with Parthian affairs and march against Bactria.

Arsaces had hoped to gain the initiative and overwhelm the Seleucid army in the mountainous region of Hyrcania. Unfortunately for the Parthians, the rugged terrain nullified the traditional advantages of a Parthian army, namely mobility and speed. The Parthian army was forced to begin dismounting cavalry and acting as infantry. Antiochus wasted no time and began pursuing the Parthian army by crossing the Alborz into Hyrcania. The Seleucid army was slowed down by obstacles created by the Parthians. Antiochus was forced to divide his army into several large bodies to pass the rough terrain, making his phalanx and baggage train particularly vulnerable. Arsaces saw an opportunity to recover from his previous mistakes by striking the Seleucid army while it was vulnerable, and so the Parthian army began harassing the slow Seleucid army. Antiochus decided to cover his army with bands of lightly armed and mobile units to protect it from Parthian attacks. Despite being dug into ambush positions, the isolated Parthian units were flushed out by the lightly armed Seleucid detachments. This represents another failure on Arsaces' behalf. Seeing the ineffectiveness of his soldiers in the mountain skirmishes, Arsaces decided to withdraw his army and regroup at the summit of a mountain pass.

=== Battle of Mount Labus ===
Arsaces II chose to make a stand at Mount Labus because the terrain allowed him to implement his cavalry. The Parthian and Seleucid armies met and fought for an entire day. Arsaces' objective was to split the Seleucid phalanx from the main body of the Seleucid army so that it could be destroyed, defeating the Seleucid army in detail. However, Antiochus III prevented his men from pursuing the Parthians, who employed offensive hit-and-run tactics throughout the battle in hopes of inspiring the phalanx to give chase. Ultimately, the Parthian cavalry was unable to break the Seleucid phalanx, and the phalanx was unable to advance, putting itself in a vulnerable situation that the Parthians could exploit, creating a stalemate. The night after the battle, contingents of the Seleucid army flanked the Parthian army, causing the Parthians to retreat further. After this victory, Antiochus resumed his march and captured the unprotected city of Tambrax, which contained a royal palace.

=== Siege of Sirynx ===
Arsaces II had so far failed to halt the Seleucid march, so he decided to drastically change his strategy to a siege defense. Sirynx was a heavily fortified city that had three moats, six wooden walls, and a strong citadel. Arsaces garrisoned a portion of his remaining army in the city for its defense, but he himself was not in the city. Antiochus besieged the city and mounted frontal assaults along with tunnelling efforts. The Parthians fought desperately and dug counter tunnels; however, the full force of the Seleucid engineers was eventually able to overpower the Parthians. The siege likely lasted for weeks. The Parthians fought frantically and hard until the inner wall began to fall. The remaining Parthian soldiers attempted a breakout but lacked enough forces to succeed. With the defense's falling and the city being demolished, the Parthian soldiers began preparing for a final assault on the Seleucid siege lines. The Parthian soldiers feared that the Greeks within the city would betray them, and so they massacred the entire Greek population of the city. The Parthians also brought anything of value from the city along with them. This indicates that the Parthians were low on funds for the campaign. The attempted breakout failed, and Antiochus took the city after a final assault, forcing the Parthians to surrender.

After the disastrous fighting in Hyrcania and the Siege of Sirynx, the Parthian army was exhausted. During the Siege of Sirynx, Arsaces remained active in the field but withdrew to the important city of Nisa in modern-day Turkmenistan to prepare for another siege. The prolonged campaign and hard fighting had encouraged Antiochus III to end the war against Parthia. Instead of engaging in another siege and removing Arsaces II from power, Antiochus decided to come to terms with him diplomatically. In 208 BCE, Arsaces II formally accepted Seleucid suzerainty and became a subordinate ally to Antiochus III. Antiochus annexed all of Parthia south of the Kopet Dag mountain range and left Arsaces with a small kingdom. Arsaces was also restricted from minting coins and likely had to supply the Seleucid army with Parthian soldiers. Antiochus had neutralized the Parthians for the time being and achieved all the goals of his campaign in Parthia.

== Activities of Arsaces II, Phriapatius, and Phraates I ==
The campaign of Antiochus III had devastated Parthia and lowered Arsaces II to a weak subordinate king. Parthian territory in northeastern Iran had been annexed by Antiochus, who relegated the Arsacids to the northernmost end of Parthia in what is now Turkmenistan. As well as being stripped of most of their territory, the Parthian military had been greatly weakened after the defeats it suffered at the hands of the Seleucids and was disabled for some time. However, with the sudden death of Antiochus III in 187 BCE, Arsaces II took advantage of Seleucid weakness and reoccupied Hecatompylus and began minting coins in his name, asserting Parthia's independence once again.

=== Reign of Phriapatius ===
Arsaces II died in 181 BCE, and the throne passed to Phriapatius, the son of a brother of Arsaces II. During his fifteen-year reign, Phriapatius strengthened the Parthian army and launched attacks on the eastern border of Seleucid Media.

=== Campaigns of Phraates I ===
Phriapatius died in 170 BCE, and his eldest son, Phraates I, became king of Parthia. Despite his reign only lasting three years, Phraates I contributed significantly to Parthia. Phraates I began his campaign by conquering Hyrcania from the Seleucids and then subduing a powerful nomadic Iranian tribe called the Mardians, who inhabited an area of the Alborz Mountains bordering Hyrcania in the east and Media in the southwest. The Parthians may have attacked them to secure Hyrcania and expand their holdings in Iran. Due to their location, the Mardians also posed a threat to trade routes from Parthia and Hyrcania to Rhaga and Ecbatana. After defeating the Mardians, Phraates conquered the entirety of the Caspian Gates from the Seleucids. Phraates then conquered the city of Charax, southeast of present-day Tehran, in which he settled large numbers of Mardians. By capturing the Caspian Gates and Charax, Phraates created a staging ground that his successor could use for further expansion. Around this time, the king of the Seleucid Empire, Antiochus IV was suppressing the Maccabean revolt, however the rapid expansion of Phraates had drawn his attention. Because the Iranian Plateau had been destabilized and Seleucid Media was threatened by the resurgent Parthians, Antiochus decided to take half of the Seleucid army and leave his western provinces to pursue a campaign against the Parthians. Before the Antiochus reached Parthia, Phraates died in 165 BCE and was succeeded by his younger brother, Mithridates I. Antiochus began by attacking Armenia and reducing it to vassalage, he then proceeded to Elymais to plunder the temple of the goddess Inanna to fund his campaign, but was repulsed by the local people. Antiochus then attempted to loot the region surrounding the old Achaemenid royal city of Persepolis, but again was driven back by the local people. These series of failures derailed Antiochus' campaign. Not long later, Antiochus died sometime between 20 November and 18 December, 164 BCE, near modern Isfahan.

== Campaigns of Mithridates I ==
The sudden expansion of Phraates I and the death of Antiochus IV altered the balance of power on the Iranian Plateau, and with the threat of the Seleucids temporarily thwarted, Mithridates I could focus on expanding the power and territory of Parthia. After the death of Antiochus' short-lived successor, Antiochus V, the Seleucid Empire fell into a series of devastating civil wars, which gave the Parthians the opportunity to expand their territory by conquering the entire Iranian Plateau and beyond, into Mesopotamia.

=== War Against the Greco-Bactrians ===
Mithridates began his reign by launching a successful campaign against the Greco-Bactrian kingdom, which was ruled by Eucratides I, in the year 165 BCE. Mithridates defeated the Greco-Bactrians, annexed Ariana, Margiana, and western Bactria up to the city of Balkh, and vassalized the kingdom. With the Greco-Bactrians defeated and vassalized, the Parthians had secured their eastern frontier and could focus on the conquest of Media. At this point, the Parthians controlled Parthia, Hyrcania, Ariana, Margiana, and a sizeable portion of Bactria. With more resources available to him, Mithridates could focus his attention west, on the Seleucid Empire.

=== Conquest of Media ===
Mithridates' campaign against the Greco-Bactrians coincided with the revolts of the Seleucid provinces of Persis and Elymais, which further destabilized and weakened the Seleucid Empire. Having secured his eastern frontiers, Mithridates was able to redirect his attention to the Seleucid Empire, specifically Media, which had been a target for expansion of the Parthians since the reign of Mithridates' predecessor, Phraates I. Phraates was successful in securing a staging ground for the conquest of Media by capturing the Caspian Gates and the city of Charax, which Mithridates could use to his advantage.

During the 160s BCE, the king of the Seleucid Empire, Demetrius I, stationed generals in the east to secure and protect the eastern provinces from Parthian aggression. These generals were able to restore Seleucid rule in Persis and Elymais, respectively. Demetrius himself could not tend to the dangerous situation brewing in the east because of the rebellion of the Seleucid satrap Timarchus, complications with the Romans in Cappadocia in 159 BCE, the revolt of the Seleucid capital, Antioch, and a civil war against Alexander Balas in 152 BCE.

Mithridates began his invasion of Media in 155 BCE; however, despite the absence of Demetrius I, the Parthian conquest of Media was slow and arduous due to the stiff and determined resistance of the Seleucid generals. The campaign eventually devolved into a war of attrition, with both sides making little progress. Sometime during his campaign in Media, Mithridates also conquered and subjugated the kingdom of Media Atropatene. In the year 150 BCE, Demetrius I was defeated and killed in battle by Alexander Balas, who became the next Seleucid king. Although Alexander defeated Demetrius, his reign was also dominated by western affairs, and he was unable to respond to the Parthians in Media. In the year 147 BCE, Media finally fell to the Parthians. In the same year, the son of Demetrius I, Demetrius II, arrived in Syria with an army and the support of the king of Ptolemaic Egypt, Ptolemy VI, to contest the rule of Alexander. In 145 BCE, Alexander Balas was defeated in battle by Demetrius and Ptolemy, and he would be assassinated shortly after, making Demetrius II the king of the Seleucid Empire. The control of Media and the Zagros passes were essential if the Parthians were to expand further west and south. Media went on to become a center of Parthian power and wealth.

=== Conquest of Babylonia ===
After the conquest of Media, Mithridates made his brother Bagasis governor of the province. In 145 BCE, Mithridates returned east to deal with a succession crisis in the Parthian vassal state of the Greco-Bactrian kingdom as well as to subdue tribes in modern-day south-eastern Iran and south-western Pakistan. Meanwhile, in the Seleucid Empire, mass unrest in Syria left the empire vulnerable. In 145 BCE, a Seleucid general named Diodotus Tryphon revolted and made a bid to place the son of the slain Alexander Balas, Antiochus VI, on the Seleucid throne. The Seleucid Empire descended into another crippling civil war. Around the same time, Persis and Elymais once again revolted and became independent states of their own.

In the year 141 BCE, Mithridates decided to strike at a crucial Seleucid territory, Babylonia. Mithridates successfully conquered Babylonia without much resistance and triumphantly entered Babylon. Babylonia offered immense wealth and prestige to the Parthians and would serve as a center of power for the Parthian Empire and the succeeding Sasanian Empire. While Mithridates led the advance into Mesopotamia, Bagasis conquered Persis around the same time. Even though by this time Mithridates had conquered large portions of the Seleucid Empire, it had come at no cost of the main Seleucid army, but had been incredibly difficult and taxing for the Parthians. The position of the Parthians remained vulnerable.

=== War with Elymais ===
Despite his victory, Mithridates I was forced to leave Babylonia and rapidly return east for unknown reasons. During this time, The Elymaens perceiving Parthian weakness, took the opportunity to invade Babylonia and wreak havoc on the region, burning the city of Apamea. Mithridates was forced to return west to respond to the sudden Elymaen aggression. Mithridates defeated the Elymaens in battle significantly enough to weaken their military capabilities for a few years and capture their capital, Susa. Mithridates returned east the same year. Despite the Mithridates' victory, the Elymaens continued resisting the Parthians until the year 132 BCE.

=== War with Demetrius II ===
Despite being embroiled in a civil war with Diodotus Tryphon, Demetrius II felt confident enough to pursue a war against the Parthians. Tryphon had lost nearly his entire army to bad weather near Ptolemais, making his position much weaker. Additionally, Tryphon executed Antiochus VI and declared himself king, which proved to be a major mistake. Despite Tryphon's setbacks, Demetrius was not in a position to remove him from power completely. In 140 BCE, Demetrius II decided to pursue war with the Parthians in order to advance his standing and retake Mesopotamia, which was an important source of revenue for him. The unstable rule of the Parthians in Babylonia combined with the invasion of the region by the Elymaens had lowered the perceived strength of the Parthians enough so that Demetrius was reportedly very confident that his eastern campaign would be successful and that he would be able to reconquer Babylonia and Media swiftly. Moreover, a victorious campaign would have given him legitimacy as the king needed to recruit troops in Syria to continue the civil war and would have boosted his prestige, wealth, and resources tremendously.

In 139 BCE, while Mithridates I was still in the east, Demetrius II invaded Babylonia. Bagasis was in charge of the defense of the region while he waited for the assistance of Mithridates. Bagasis, with a much smaller force, continuously harassed the Seleucid army in an attempt to coerce Demetrius into making mistakes while advancing deeper into Babylonia. Bagasis successfully stalled the Seleucids for an entire year by skirmishing and avoiding pitched battles. During this time, Bagasis intentionally made it appear as if he was losing the skirmishes in order to inspire complacency and overconfidence in Demetrius. Meanwhile, Mithridates was marching through Media with the main Parthian army as Bagasis slowly drew Demetrius deeper into Babylonia. In the summer of 138 BCE, Mithridates suddenly arrived in Babylonia, catching Demetrius by surprise. The two forces proceeded to fight a battle in which the Seleucid army was annihilated. Demetrius attempted to flee from Babylonia but was captured by the Parthians.

The capture of Demetrius by the Parthians was a great boon for the prestige of the Arsacid dynasty while being a devastating blow to the influence, power, and prestige of the Seleucids. Mithridates proceeded to parade Demetrius from city to city, demonstrating his victory over the Seleucids and as a symbol of his power. Demetrius was treated fairly and with honor by the Parthians, even being married to one of Mithridates' daughters. Although the Parthians had defeated the Seleucids and protected their newly won territory of Babylonia, their grasp on the region remained fragile. Shortly after Mithridates defeated the Seleucids, he promptly returned east, where he fell seriously ill and, after six years of suffering from the illness, died in 132 BCE. Mithridates was succeeded by his son, Phraates II.

== Rise of the Arsacids and the end of the Seleucid Empire ==
Seleucid power began to weaken after the defeat of Antiochus III at the hands of the Romans at the Battle of Magnesia which effectively broke Seleucid power and in particular the Seleucid army. After this defeat, Antiochus began an expedition into Iran, but was killed in Elymaïs. The Arsacids then took power in Parthia and declared their full independence from the Seleucid Empire. In 148 BC, the Parthian king Mithridates I invaded Media which was already in revolt against the Seleucid empire, and in 141 BC the Parthians captured the major Seleucid city of Seleucia (which was the eastern capital of the Seleucid empire). These victories gave Mithridates control over Mesopotamia and Babylonia. In 139 BC the Parthians defeated a major Seleucid counterattack, breaking the Seleucid army, and captured the Seleucid King, Demetrius II, thus effectively ending Seleucid claims to any land east of the Euphrates river. In order to recover this territory, Antiochus VII Sidetes, launched a counter-offensive against the Parthians in 130 BC, initially defeating them in battle. The Parthians sent a delegation to negotiate a peace agreement, but ultimately rejected the terms proposed by Antiochus. The Seleucid army was then dispersed into winter quarters. Seeing an opportunity to strike, the Parthians, under Phraates II, ambushed the Seleucid army and Antiochus was either killed or committed suicide.

The loss of so much territory sent the already enfeebled empire into a decline from which it could never recover. The Seleucid Empire became a rump state which consisted of little more than Antioch and the surrounding lands. The only reason the Seleucid Empire continued to exist is because the Parthians saw it as a useful buffer against the Roman Empire. When Pompey led a Roman expedition into Syria, he annexed the Seleucid Empire, and the stage was set for the Roman–Parthian Wars.

== Parthian victory ==
The westward expansion of Parthia during the war would eventually lead to clashes with the Roman Empire. The Roman–Parthian Wars would embroil these ancient empires until the 3rd century.

== Sources ==
- Dabrowa, E.; Dzielska, M.; Salamon, M.; Sprawski, S., eds. (2010). Hortus Historiae: Studies in Honour of Professor Jozef Wolski. Historia Iagiellonica.
  - Olbrycht, Marek. "Mithridates I of Parthia and His Conquests up to 141 B.C.". In Dabrowa et al. (2010), pp. 229-241.
- Olbrycht, Marek Jan (2021). Early Arsakid Parthia (ca. 250-165 B.C.): At the Crossroads of Iranian, Hellenistic, and Central Asian History. Brill.
- Overtoom, Nikolaus Leo (2020). Reign of Arrows: The Rise of the Parthian Empire in the Hellenistic Middle East. Oxford University Press.
- Schippmann, K. (1986). "ARSACIDS ii. The Arsacid dynasty". Encyclopedia Iranica.
- Shahbazi, A. Shapur (2011). "CHARAX". Encyclopaedia Iranica.
- Sherwin-White, Susan; Kuhrt, Amelie (1993). From Samarkhand to Sardis: A New Approach to the Seleucid Empire. University of California Press.
- Yarshater, Ehsan, ed. (2003). The Cambridge History of Iran. Vol. 3 (I): The Seleucid, Parthian and Sasanian Periods. Cambridge University Press.
  - Bivar, A.D.H. "The Political History of Iran under the Arsacids". In Yarshater (2003), pp. 28–31.
