= Andragoras =

Andragoras is the name of two Hellenistic satraps:

- Andragoras (Seleucid satrap) (died 238 BCE), also known as Narisanka
- Andragoras (4th century BC), also known as Andragoras the Persian
