= Dionysius (ambassador) =

Dionysius (Ancient Greek: Διονύσιος) was a Greek ambassador of Plotemaic Kingdom in 3rd century BCE, who was sent by Ptolemy Philadelphus of Egypt as ambassador to the court of the Maurya Empire of India in the reign of either Bindusara or Ashoka.

Dionysius is mentioned in a passage of Pliny the Elder:

But India has been treated of by several other Greek writers who resided at the courts of Indian kings, such, for instance, as Megasthenes, and by Dionysius, who was sent thither by Philadelphus, expressly for the purpose: all of whom have enlarged upon the power and vast resources of these nations. —Pliny the Elder, The Natural History, book 6, Chap. 21

== See also ==
- Megasthenes
- Deimachus
