= Mnesis =

Mnesis (fl. 3rd century BCE) was a mistress of Ptolemy Philadelphus. According to Athenaeus, she was a flute-player.
