= Patrocles (geographer) =

Greek general, geographer and writer

- Occupations: Geographer, general, author
- Years active: c. 312 – 270 BCE

Patrocles (Greek: Πατροκλῆς) (active c. 312 – 270 BCE) was a Greek and specifically a Macedonian general and writer on geographical subjects.

He served Seleucus and Antiochus for several decades. After exploring the Caspian Sea, Patrocles concluded that the Caspian was a gulf or inlet that could be entered from the Indian Ocean. The only information on his work (even the title is unknown) is documented in the work of Strabo. As a military officer, Patrocles was a skilled engineer and, at one point, managed to defend Babylonia for Seleucus against Demetrius Poliorcetes by flooding the irrigation canals.

After the death of Seleucus, Patrocles was sent by his successor Antiochus to put down a revolt in Asia Minor. However, his forces were defeated there in an engagement with the Bithynians.

== See also ==
- Demodamas
- Megasthenes
