= Deimachus =

3rd-century BC Greek writer and diplomat

Deimachus or Daimachus (/diˈɪməkəs/; Ancient Greek: Δηΐμαχος or Δαΐμαχος) was a Greek from Plataeae, who lived during the third-century BCE. He became an ambassador to the court of the Mauryan ruler Bindusara "Amitragatha" (son of Chandragupta Maurya) in Pataliputra in India. Deimachus was sent by Antiochus I Soter.

As an ambassador, he was the successor to the famous ambassador and historian Megasthenes. Both of them were mentioned by Strabo.

Both of these men were sent [as] ambassadors to Palimbothra (Pataliputra): Megasthenes to Sandrocottus, Deimachus to Allitrochades his son.

Deimachus apparently wrote extensively on India, and is quoted as a reference in geographical matters, although his works are now lost.

It is likely there are more than 3000 stadia, but taking this number, if we add thereto the 30,000 stadia, which Deimachus states there are between [the southern extremity of India] and the country of the Bactrians and Sogdians, we shall find both of these nations lie beyond the temperate zone and habitable earth.

The computations of Megasthenes and Deïmachus are more moderate, for they estimate the distance from the Southern Sea to Caucasus at above 20,000 stadia.

Strabo, however, disputed these figures, and some of the fanciful accounts of both men, although they also brought extensive knowledge about India.

Generally speaking, the men who hitherto have written on the affairs of India, were a set of liars. Deimachus holds the first place in the list, Megasthenes comes next, while Onesicritus and Nearchus, with others of the same class, manage to stammer out a few words [of truth]. Of this we became the more convinced whilst writing the history of Alexander. No faith whatever can be placed in Deimachus and Megasthenes. They coined the fables concerning men with ears large enough to sleep in, men without any mouths, without noses, with only one eye, with spider-legs, and with fingers bent backward. They renewed Homer's fable concerning the battles of the Cranes and Pygmies, and asserted the latter to be three spans high. They told of ants digging for gold, of Pans with wedge-shaped heads, of serpents swallowing down oxen and stags, horns and all; meantime, as Eratosthenes has observed, reciprocally accusing each other of falsehood.

== Modern assessments ==
Although Deimachus's original writings have not survived, fragments cited by later authors—primarily Strabo—confirm that he wrote an extensive treatise on the Indian subcontinent during his time as a Seleucid ambassador to the Mauryan court. His surviving fragments focus heavily on the geographical scale, distances, and natural wonders of India. These accounts, though frequently dismissed as untrustworthy by classical geographers due to their inclusion of mythical elements like gold-digging ants, continue to provide historians with valuable insight into early Hellenistic perspectives on the Mauryan Empire.

A recent reassessment by historian Claire Atwood argues that Deimachus likely had access to court informants and temple records during his extended stay at Bindusara’s court, possibly longer than Megasthenes’s own tenure.
