= Andragoras (4th century BC) =

Not to be mistaken for Andragoras, a Seleucid satrap of around 250 BC.

Andragoras the Parthian (Greek: Ανδραγόρας) seems to have been a satrap of Alexander from 331 BC in the area of Parthia (Justin, xii. 4). According to Justin, he was selected among the noble Persians, and is at the origin of the Parthian dynasty:

Afterwards, the Parthian being submitted, Andragoras, chosen among noble Persians was given to them as a prefect. Later, Parthian kings found in him their origin (Parthis deinde domitis praefectus his statuitur ex nobilibus Persarum Andragoras; inde postea originem Parthorum reges habuere.) Justin, xii. 4^{[usurped]}

Andragoras is not mentioned in the partition of power of the Treaty of Triparadisus in 321 BC, when instead Philip was named as the ruler of Parthia. This would suggest that Andragoras either fell from favour or died in the meantime.

There is a possibility that this Andragoras never existed and is only mentioned by Justin by mistake, since in other classical sources Phrataphernes is usually mentioned as the satrap of Parthia until the time of Philip. He may also have been confused with the 3rd century satrap of Parthia Andragoras.
