= Demodamas =

Seleucid official of the 3rd century BC

Demodamas (Greek: Δημοδάμας) (flourished in the 3rd century BC), was a Seleucid official of the 3rd century BC. Demodamas was born in Miletus, and was the son of Aristides. He served as a general of the Seleucids under Seleucus I Nicator and Antiochus I Soter. Around 294–293 and 281–280 BC, Demodamas served as the satrap of the Seleucids in Bactria and Sogdiana. At the time, he undertook military expeditions across the Syr Darya to explore the lands of the Scythians, during which he traveled further to the north than any Greeks before him, with the possible exception of Alexander the Great. During the expedition, he repopulated Alexandria Eschate, which had been destroyed by a previous barbarian attack. He also constructed several altars in honour of Apollo along the river. Demodamas later wrote an autobiographical account of his expeditions in Central Asia, which served as an important source for the Roman geographers Strabo and Pliny the Elder.

== See also ==
- Patrocles
- Megasthenes

== Sources ==
- Kosmin, Paul J. (2014), The Land of the Elephant Kings: Space, Territory, and Ideology in Seleucid Empire, Harvard University Press, ISBN 978-0-674-72882-0
