= Parthian–Greco Bactrian War =

Date	150s BC
Location	Bactria
Result	Parthian victory
Territorial changes	Western Bactria annexed to the Parthian Empire

Belligerents
Parthian Empire	Greco-Bactrian Kingdom

Commanders and leaders
Mithridates I	Eucratides I

The Parthian–Bactrian War refers to the invasion of the Greco-Bactrian Kingdom by Mithridates I of Parthia in 150s BC, which ended with a Parthian victory and annexation of Western Bactria to the new emerging Iranian power, the Parthian Empire. This war left the Bactrian Kingdom very weakened and open to nomadic invasions, which eventually led to rise of the Kushan Empire in Bactria.

The Roman historian Justin says "the Bactrians, involved in various wars, lost not only their rule but also their freedom, as, exhausted by their wars against the Sogdians, the Arachotes, the Dranges, the Arians and the Indians, they were finally crushed, as if drawn of all their blood, by an enemy weaker than them, the Parthians.", and according to the Greco-Roman historian Strabo "The satrapy Turiva and that of Aspionus were taken away from Eucratides by the Parthians."

== Bibliography ==
Daryaee, Touraj (2012). The Oxford Handbook of Iranian History. Oxford University Press. pp. 1–432. ISBN 978-0-19-987575-7. Archived from the original on 2019-01-01.
