= Aglais (musician) =

Ancient Greek musician

Aglais (3rd century BC) was an Ancient Greek musician.

She was the daughter of Megalokles or Megakles. Aglais was active as a professional musician (trumpeter) in Alexandria in Egypt. She was engaged for public processions and festivities and appear to have been a well-known musician of her time. During one of her assignments, she appeared in a procession dressed in a wig and a helmet, in the appearance of the goddess Athena.

While there is nothing confirming that she was a hetairai, she was the role model for the mother of the contemporary Aristainetos' fictional character Melissarion, a hetaira whose mother Aglais acted as her pimp.
