= Megasthenes =

Ancient Greek ethnographer and explorer

- Μεγασθένης
- Died: c. 290 BCE
- Occupations: Historian and diplomat
- Notable work: Indica

Megasthenes (/mɪˈɡæsθɪniːz/ mi-GAS-thi-neez; Ancient Greek: Μεγασθένης, died c. 290 BCE) was an ancient Greek historian, indologist, diplomat, ethnographer and explorer in the Hellenistic period. He described India in his book Indica, which is now lost, but has been partially reconstructed from literary fragments found in later authors that quoted his work. Megasthenes was the first person from the Western world to leave a written description of India.

== Biography ==
While Megasthenes's account of India has survived in the later works, little is known about him as a person. He spent time at the court of Sibyrtius, who was a satrap of Arachosia under Antigonus I and then Seleucus I. Megasthenes was then an ambassador for Seleucid king Seleucus I Nicator and to the court of the Mauryan Emperor Chandragupta Maurya in Pataliputra (modern Patna). Dating for his journey to the Mauryan court is uncertain; Seleucus I reigned from 305 to 281 BCE for the loose range of years that Megasthenes' mission might have begun.

=== As ambassador ===
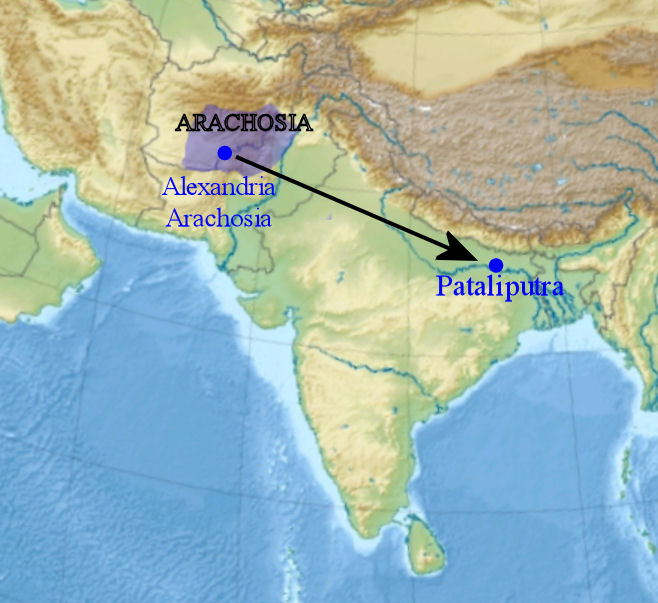
According to Arrian, Megasthenes lived in Arachosia and travelled to Pataliputra.

Megasthenes was a Greek ambassador of Seleucus I Nicator in the court of Chandragupta Maurya. Arrian explains that Megasthenes lived in Arachosia, with the satrap Sibyrtius, from where he visited India:

Megasthenes lived with Sibyrtius, satrap of Arachosia, and often speaks of his visiting Sandracottus, the king of the Indians.

— Arrian, Anabasis Alexandri

Megasthenes visited Pataliputra sometime during the reign of Chandragupta Maurya but it is not certain which other parts of India he visited. He appears to have passed through the Punjab region in north-western India, as he provides a detailed account of the rivers in this area. He must have then traveled to Pataliputra along the Yamuna and the Ganga rivers. The exact dates of his visit (or visits) to India, and the duration of his stay in India are uncertain and disputed among scholars. A.B. Bosworth argued for an early date pre-Seleucus. This is contested by Stoneman and others who argue for a date following the Mauryan-Seleucid settlement of c. 303 BCE. Arrian claims that Megasthenes met Porus; this implies that Megasthenes accompanied Alexander the Great during the Macedonian invasion of India.

He then compiled information about India in the form of Indica, a document which is now a lost work. It partially survives in form of quotations by later writers.

Other Greek envoys to the Indian court are known after Megasthenes: Deimachus as ambassador to Bindusara, and Dionysius, as ambassador to Ashoka.

== Assessment ==
Among the ancient writers, Arrian (2nd century CE) is the only one who speaks favorably of Megasthenes. Diodorus (1st century BCE) quotes Megasthenes while omitting some parts of his narratives. Other writers explicitly criticize Megasthenes:

- Eratosthenes (2nd century BCE) accuses Megasthenes of engaging in falsehood, although he apparently borrowed much of his content about India from Megasthenes.
- Strabo (1st century CE) calls Megasthenes a liar for writing fabulous stories about India; he also brands as liars the other earlier writers on India, including Deimachus, Onesicritus, Nearchus. According to Strabo, "no faith whatever can be placed in Deimachos and Megasthenes".
- Pliny the Elder (1st century CE) criticizes Megasthenes's description of the fabulous races of India, and his account of Herakles and Dionysus.

Modern scholars such as E. A. Schwanbeck, B. C. J. Timmer, and Truesdell Sparhawk Brown, have characterized Megasthenes as a generally reliable source of Indian history. Schwanbeck finds faults only with Megasthenes's description of the gods worshipped in India. Brown is more critical of Megasthenes, but notes that Megasthenes visited only a small part of India, and must have relied on others for his observations: some of these observations seem to be erroneous, but others cannot be ignored by modern researchers. Thus, although he was often misled by the erroneous information provided by others, his work remained the principal source of information about India to subsequent writers.

== See also ==
- Megasthenes' Herakles
- Herodotus
- Patrocles
- Demodamas
