= Parni conquest of Parthia =

Ancient war

- Part of Seleucid–Parthian wars
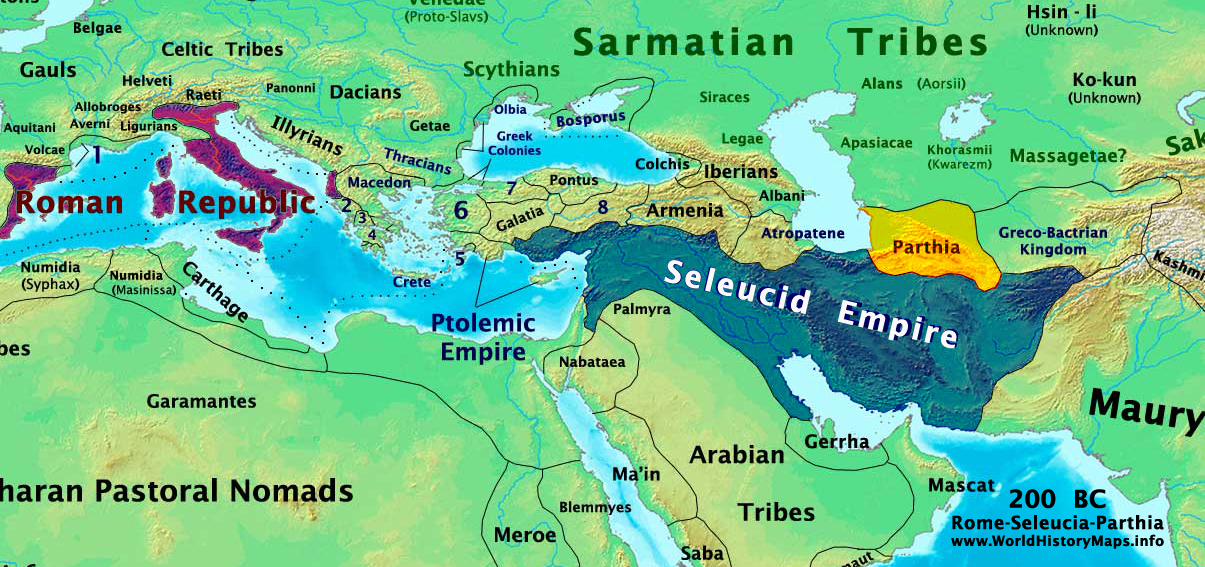
- Location of Parthia.
Date	238 BC
Location	Parthia
Result	Parni victory

Belligerents
Parni	Kingdom of Parthia

Commanders and leaders
Arsaces	Andragoras †

In 245 BC, Andragoras, the Seleucid governor (satrap) of Parthia ("roughly western Khurasan") proclaimed independence from the Seleucids, when - following the death of Antiochus II - Ptolemy III seized control of the Seleucid capital at Antioch, and "so left the future of the Seleucid dynasty for a moment in question."

Meanwhile, "a man called Arsaces, of Scythian or Bactrian^{[a]} origin, [was] elected leader of the Parni tribes." Following the secession of Parthia from the Seleucid Empire and the resultant loss of Seleucid military support, Andragoras had difficulty in maintaining his borders, and about 238 BCE—under the command of "Arsaces and his brother Tiridates"—the Parni invaded Parthia and seized control of Astabene (Astawa), the northern region of that territory, the administrative capital of which was Kabuchan (Kuchan in the vulgate).

A short while later the Parni seized the rest of Parthia from Andragoras, killing him in the process. The dynasty founded by Arsaces would eventually conquer further territories and form the Parthian Empire.

== See also ==
- Parni
- Seleucid–Parthian Wars

== Notes ==
a Arsaces was "perhaps originally a local ruler in Bactria."

== Sources ==
- Bickerman, Elias J. (1983), "The Seleucid Period", in Yarshater, Ehsan (ed.), Cambridge History of Iran, vol. 3, London: Cambridge UP, pp. 3–20
- Bivar, A.D.H. (1983), "The Political History of Iran under the Arsacids", in Yarshater, Ehsan (ed.), Cambridge History of Iran, vol. 3, London: Cambridge UP, pp. 21–99
- Bivar, A.D.H. (2003), "Gorgan v.: Pre-Islamic History", Encyclopaedia Iranica, vol. 11, New York: iranica.com
- Curtis, Vesta Sarkhosh; Stewart, Sarah, eds. (2007), The Age of the Parthians, Ideas of Iran, vol. 2, London: I. B. Tauris
