= Parni =

Ancient Iranian people

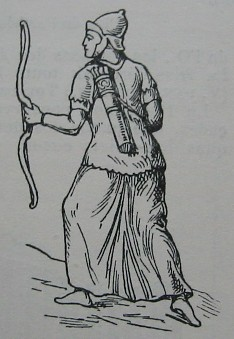
Parnian Warrior

The Parni (/ˈpɑːrnaɪ/; Ancient Greek: Πάρνοι, Parnoi), Aparni (/əˈpɑːrnaɪ/; Ἄπαρνοι, Aparnoi) or Parnians were a Scythian people who lived around the Ochus (Ancient Greek: Ὧχος Okhos) (Tejen) River, southeast of the Caspian Sea in Central Asia. It is believed that their original homeland may have been what is now southern Russia in Eastern Europe, from where they emigrated with other Scythian tribes. The Parni were one of the three tribes of the Dahae confederacy.

In the middle of the 3rd century BCE, the Parni invaded Parthia, "drove away the Greek satraps, who had then only just acquired independence, and founded a new dynasty", that of the Arsacids.

== Historical identity and location ==
There is no unambiguous evidence of the Parni in native Iranian language sources,^{cf.} and all references to these people come from Greek and Latin accounts. In these accounts, which are not necessarily contemporaneous, it is difficult to unambiguously identify references to the Parni due to inconsistency of Greek/Latin naming and transliteration, and/or the similarity to names of other tribes such as the Sparni or Apartani and the Eparnoi or Asparioi. It may also be that the Parni are related to one or more of these other tribes, and that "their original homeland may have been southern Russia from where they emigrated with other Scythian tribes."

The location of the Parni Dahae immediately south-east of the Caspian Sea was derived from by Strabo's Geographica (Book 11, 1st century BCE). The ethnonym of the Dahae was the root of the later placename Dahestan or Dihistan – a region straddling the present regions of Turkmenistan and Iran. So little is known of the Dahae, including the Parni, that – in the words of A. D. H. Bivar – even the location and name of their capital city "if indeed they possessed one" is unknown. A later archaeological site in the region, known as Dehistan/Mishrian, is located in the Balkan Region of Turkmenistan.

== Language ==
The language^{[c]} of the Parni is not directly attested but is assumed to be one of the eastern substrates of the subsequently recorded Parthian language, which the Parni eventually adopted. To the "incoming Parni may be ascribed a form of speech showing a strong east Iranian element, resulting from their proximity on the steppe to east Iranian Sakas." Through the influence of the Parthians in Armenia, traces of the Parni language survive as "loan-words in Armenian."

The language of the Parni "was described by Justin as 'midway between Scythian and Median [and] contained features of both'" (41.1.10). Justin's late (3rd century) opinion is "no doubt slightly exaggerated," and is in any case of questionable veracity given the ambiguity of names.

== Rise to prominence ==
In 247 BCE, Andragoras, the Seleucid governor (satrap) of Parthia ("roughly western Khurasan") proclaimed independence from the Seleucids, when—following the death of Antiochus II—Ptolemy III seized control of the Seleucid capital at Antioch, and "so left the future of the Seleucid dynasty for a moment in question."

Meanwhile, "a man called Arsaces, of Scythian or Bactrian^{[a]} origin, [was] elected leader of the Parni tribes." Following the secession of Parthia from the Seleucid Empire and the resultant loss of Seleucid military support, Andragoras had difficulty in maintaining his borders, and about 238 BCE—under the command of "Arsaces and his brother Tiridates"—the Parni invaded Parthia and seized control of Astabene (Astawa), the northern region of that territory, the administrative capital of which was Kabuchan (Kuchan in the vulgate).

A short while later, the Parni seized the rest of Parthia from Andragoras, killing him in the process. Although an initial punitive expedition by the Seleucids under Seleucus II was not successful, the Seleucids under Antiochus III recaptured Arsacid-controlled territory following the Battle of Mount Labus in 209 BCE from Arsaces' (or Tiridates'^{[b]}) successor, Arsaces II. Arsaces II sued for peace and accepted vassal status, and it was not until Arsaces II's grandson (or grand-nephew) Phraates I, that the Arsacids/Parni would again begin to assert their independence.

For the historiographers upon whose documentation the reconstruction of early Arsacid history depends, the Parni had by then become indistinguishable from the Parthians.

== Legacy ==
The seizure of Astabene in 238 BCE nominally marks the beginning of the Arsacid era, which is named after Arsaces, and the name adopted by all Parthian kings. The Arsacid dynasts laid claim to descent from Artaxerxes II. Beginning from Astabene and Parthia (which would subsequently be extended southwards to include much of present-day Sistan), the Arsacids gradually subjugated many of the neighboring kingdoms, most of which were thereafter controlled as vassalries. Beginning with the successful revolt - in 224 CE - of an erstwhile vassal of Stakhr named Ardashir (in Greek again "Arsaces"/"Artaxerxes"), the Arsacid/Parthian hegemony began to yield to a Sassanid/Persian one.

The name "Parni" reappears in Sassanid-era documents to identify one of the seven Parthian feudal families allied with the Sassanid court. However, this family is not attested from Arsacid times, and the claim to the "Parni" name is (like four of the six other families) "in all probability not in accordance with reality." "It may be that [...] members of them made up their own genealogies in order to emphasize the antiquity of their families."

It has been suggested that the Parnau Hills (Paran Koh) bear the name of the Parni.

== Notes ==
- a Arsaces was "perhaps originally a local ruler in Bactria."
- b The origins of the Arsacids lineage are based on the historiography of later Greeks and Romans; the fact remains that the Arsacids used Greek titles and Greek inscriptions on their coins, which were also styled after the Seleucid coins. While Wolski (1937/1938) supported that the story of the two brothers may even be fiction, their coins are real, and they are considered to be historical personae and that Tiridates (I) succeeded his brother Arsaces (I), although he took on the Arsaces name at his coronation, a not-unusual practice in that era. Some have also questioned the relationship between Tiridates I (a.k.a. Arsaces II) and his son and successor Arsaces II (a.k.a. Artabanus I). For example, Bivar has rejected the genealogies proposed by Frye and Chaumont & Bickermann.
- c In linguistics and philology, the expression 'Parnian' is sometimes used as a term of convenience to collectively denote eastern Iranian influences evident in the (western Iranian) Parthian language. Because the language of the Parni is not actually attested, it is not possible to determine whether there is actually a specific correlation between the language of the Parni and that of the east Iranian element in Parthian.

== Sources ==
- Bickerman, Elias J. (1983), "The Seleucid Period", in Yarshater, Ehsan (ed.), Cambridge History of Iran, vol. 3, London: Cambridge UP, pp. 3–20
- Bivar, A.D.H. (1983), "The Political History of Iran under the Arsacids", in Yarshater, Ehsan (ed.), Cambridge History of Iran, vol. 3, London: Cambridge UP, pp. 21–99
- Bivar, A.D.H. (2003), "Gorgan v.: Pre-Islamic History", Encyclopaedia Iranica, vol. 11, New York: Encyclopaedia Iranica]
- Curtis, Vesta Sarkhosh; Stewart, Sarah, eds. (2007), The Age of the Parthians, Ideas of Iran, vol. 2, London: I. B. Tauris
- de Blois, Lukas; van der Spek, Robartus J. (1997), An Introduction to the Ancient World, New York: Routledge, ISBN 0-415-12774-2.
- Lecoq, Pierre (1987), "Aparna", Encyclopaedia Iranica, vol. 2, New York: Routledge & Kegan Paul
- Lendering, Jona (2006), The Parni, Amsterdam: livius.org, archived from the original on 2013-07-31
- Lukonin, Vladimir G. (1983), "Political, Social and Administrative Institutions", in Yarshater, Ehsan (ed.), Cambridge History of Iran, vol. 3, London: Cambridge UP, pp. 681–747
- Rawlinson, Henry C. (1879), "The Road to Merv", Proceedings of the Royal Geographical Society and Monthly Record of Geography, New Monthly Series, 1 (3): 161–191, doi:10.2307/1800653, JSTOR 1800653
- Yarshater, Ehsan (2006), "Iran ii. Iranian History: An Overview", Encyclopaedia Iranica, vol. 13, New York: Encyclopaedia Iranica
