= Andragoras (Seleucid satrap) =

Iranian satrap

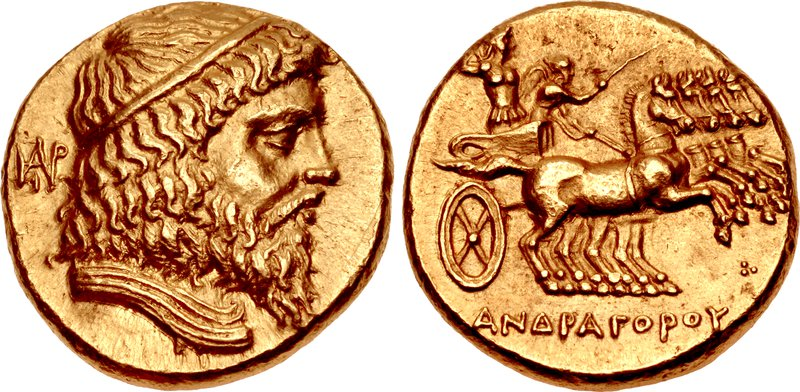
- Stater of Andragoras. Obv:Bearded ruler wearing the tiara. Rev': Greek legend ΑΝΔΡΑΓΟΡΟΥ ("of Andragoras"). Quadriga driven by Nike, together with an armed warrior.

Ruler of Parthia and Hyrcania
- Reign: 245–238 BC
- Successor: Arsaces I
- Died: 238 BC; Parthia

Not to be mistaken for Andragoras, a satrap of Alexander from 331 BC, also in the area of Parthia.

Andragoras (Greek: Ἀνδραγόρας; died 238 BC) was an Iranian satrap of the Seleucid provinces of Parthia and Hyrcania under the Seleucid rulers Antiochus I Soter and Antiochus II Theos. He later revolted against his overlords, ruling independently from 245 BC till his death.

== Biography ==
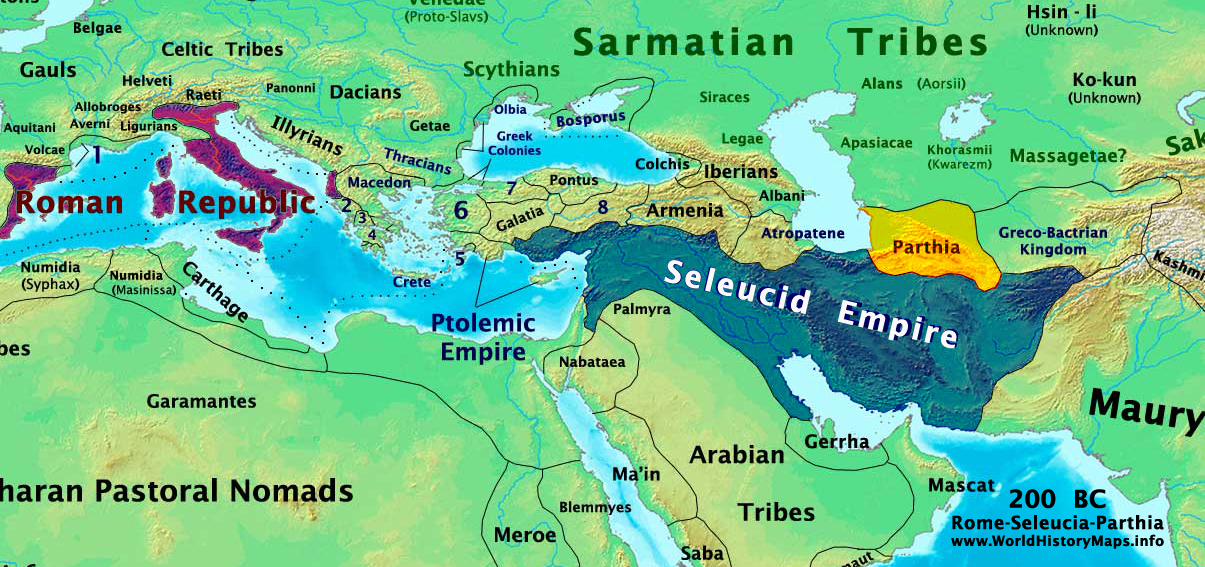
Location of Parthia and its surroundings.

The background of Andragoras is obscure. His name may have been a Greek translation of the Old Persian Narisanka and Avestan nairya-sanha- (one of the messengers of Ahura Mazda). A Greek inscription from Hyrcania (Gurgan) written before 266 BC makes mention of a certain Andragoras of lesser status who was presumably the same person before he was appointed satrap. The name of Andragoras is uncommon, and the only other reportage of the name is in the Greek papyri from Ptolemaic Egypt, thus the identification of the two is not far-fetched. Andragoras was later appointed governor of the frontier province of Parthia, which had been merged with the neighboring province of Hyrcania since the conquest of the Achaemenid Empire by the Macedonian ruler Alexander the Great in 330 BC.

Parthia was during this period constantly receiving new waves of Iranian migrants from Central Asia, most notably the Parni led by Arsaces I. Around 245 BC, Andragoras proclaimed his independence from the Seleucid monarch Seleucus II Callinicus (r. 246 – 225 BC), and made his governorate an independent kingdom. Following the secession of Parthia and Hyrcania from the Seleucid Empire and the resultant loss of Seleucid military support, Andragoras had difficulty in maintaining his borders, and about 238 BC—under the command of Arsaces I, the Parni invaded Parthia and seized control of Astabene (Astawa) from Andragoras, the northern region of that territory, the administrative capital of which was Kuchan. A short while later the Parni seized the rest of Parthia from Andragoras, killing him in the process. Hyrcania was shortly conquered by the Parni as well.

== Bibliography ==
=== Ancient works ===
- Justin, Epitome of the Philippic History of Pompeius Trogus.
- Ammianus Marcellinus, Res Gestae.
- Strabo, Geographica.

=== Modern works ===
- Frye, R. N. (1985). "Andragoras". Encyclopaedia Iranica, Vol. II, Fasc. 1. p. 26.
- Frye, Richard Nelson (1984). The History of Ancient Iran. C.H.Beck. pp. 1–411. ISBN 9783406093975. "false."
- Bickerman, Elias J. (1983), "The Seleucid Period", in Yarshater, Ehsan (ed.), Cambridge History of Iran, vol. 3, Oxford: Cambridge University Press, pp. 3–20
- Bivar, A.D.H. (1983), "The Political History of Iran under the Arsacids", in Yarshater, Ehsan (ed.), Cambridge History of Iran, vol. 3, Oxford: Cambridge University Press, pp. 21–99
- Curtis, Vesta Sarkhosh (2007), "The Iranian Revival in the Parthian Period", in Curtis, Vesta Sarkhosh; Stewart, Sarah (eds.), The Age of the Parthians: The Ideas of Iran, vol. 2, London & New York: I.B. Tauris & Co Ltd., in association with the London Middle East Institute at SOAS and the British Museum, pp. 7–25, ISBN 978-1-84511-406-0
- Dąbrowa, Edward (2012). "The Arsacid Empire". In Daryaee, Touraj (ed.). The Oxford Handbook of Iranian History. Oxford University Press. pp. 1–432. ISBN 978-0-19-987575-7. Archived from the original on 2019-01-01.
- Kia, Mehrdad (2016). The Persian Empire: A Historical Encyclopedia [2 volumes]: A Historical Encyclopedia. ABC-CLIO. ISBN 978-1610693912.
- Lecoq, P. (1986). "Aparna". Encyclopaedia Iranica, Vol. II, Fasc. 2. p. 151.
- Pourshariati, Parvaneh (2017). "KĀRIN". Encyclopaedia Iranica.
- Pourshariati, Parvaneh (2008). Decline and Fall of the Sasanian Empire: The Sasanian-Parthian Confederacy and the Arab Conquest of Iran. London and New York: I.B. Tauris. ISBN 978-1-84511-645-3.
- Rezakhani, Khodadad (2013). "Arsacid, Elymaean, and Persid Coinage". In Potts, Daniel T. (ed.). The Oxford Handbook of Ancient Iran. Oxford University Press. ISBN 978-0199733309.
- Schippmann, K. (1986). "Arsacids ii. The Arsacid dynasty". Encyclopaedia Iranica, Vol. II, Fasc. 5. pp. 525–536.
- Sellwood, David (1983). "Parthian Coins". In Yarshater, Ehsan (ed.). The Cambridge History of Iran: The Seleucid, Parthian and Sasanian Periods. Vol. 3(1). Cambridge: Cambridge University Press. pp. 279—298. ISBN 0-521-20092-X.
- Shahbazi, A. Sh. (1986). "Arsacids i. Origins". Encyclopaedia Iranica, Vol. II, Fasc. 5. p. 525.
- Sinisi, Fabrizio (2012). "The Coinage of the Parthians". In Metcalf, William E. (ed.). The Oxford Handbook of Greek and Roman Coinage. Oxford University Press. ISBN 978-0195305746.

Andragoras (Seleucid satrap)
New title	Ruler of Parthia and Hyrcania; 245–238 BC	Succeeded by Arsaces I
