= Indica (Megasthenes) =

Lost account of Mauryan India by Greek writer Megasthenes

Indika (Greek: Ἰνδικά; Latin: Indica) is an account of Mauryan India by the Greek writer Megasthenes (died c. 290 BCE). The original work is now lost, but its fragments have survived in later Greek and Latin works. The earliest of these works are those by Diodorus Siculus, Strabo (Geographica), Pliny, and Arrian (Indica).

== Reconstruction ==
Megasthenes' Indica can be reconstructed using the portions preserved by later writers as direct quotations or paraphrase. The parts that belonged to the original text can be identified from the later works based on similar content, vocabulary and phrasing, even when the content has not been explicitly attributed to Megasthenes. Felix Jacoby's Fragmente der griechischen Historiker contains 36 pages of content traced to Megasthenes.

E. A. Schwanbeck identified several fragments attributed to Megasthenes and compiled them into a collection in Latin in 1846. Based on Schwanbeck's work, John Watson McCrindle published a reconstructed version of Indica in 1877. However, this reconstruction is not universally accepted. Schwanbeck and McCrindle attributed several fragments in the writings of the 1st century BCE writer Diodorus to Megasthenes. However, Diodorus does not mention Megasthenes even once, unlike Strabo, who explicitly mentions Megasthenes as one of his sources. There are several differences between the accounts of Megasthenes and Diodorus: for example, Diodorus describes India as 28,000 stadia (roughly 5,000 km, 3,000 miles) long from east to west; Megasthenes gives this number as 16,000 (3,000 km, 2,000 miles). Diodorus states that the Indus may be the world's largest river after the Nile; Megasthenes (as quoted by Arrian) states that the Ganges is much larger than the Nile. Historian R. C. Majumdar points out that the Fragments I and II attributed to Megasthenes in McCrindle's edition cannot originate from the same source, because Fragment I describes the Nile as larger than the Indus, while Fragment II describes the Indus as longer than the Nile and the Danube combined.

Schwanbeck's Fragment XXVII includes four paragraphs from Strabo, and Schwanbeck attributes these entire paragraphs to Megasthenes. However, Strabo cites Megasthenes as his source only for three isolated statements in three different paragraphs. It is likely that Strabo sourced the rest of the text from sources other than Megasthenes: that's why he attributes only three statements specifically to Megasthenes.

Another example is the earliest confirmed description of Gandaridae, which appears in the writings of Diodorus. McCrindle believed that Diodorus' source for this description was the now-lost book of Megasthenes. However, according to A. B. Bosworth (1996), Diodorus obtained this information from Hieronymus of Cardia: Diodorus described the Ganges as 30 stadia (6 km, 4 miles) wide; it is well-attested by other sources that Megasthenes described the median or minimum width of the Ganges as 100 stadia (20 km, 12 miles).

Fragments used by John Watson McCrindle to reconstruct Megasthenes' Indica
#	Work	Author / Editor	Section	Topic	Book number in Megasthenes' Indica
1	Bibliotheca historica	Diodorus Siculus	II.35-42	Summary of India	Summary
2	Bibliotheca historica	Diodorus Siculus	III.63	Three persons named Dionusos	Summary
3	The Anabasis of Alexander	Arrian	V. 6. 2-11	Boundaries and rivers	I
4	Indica (Arrian)	Arrian	II. 1. 7	Boundaries	I
5	Geographica	Strabo	XV.1.11	Boundaries and extent	I
6	Geographica	Strabo	II.1.7	Size of India	I
7	Geographica	Strabo	XV.1.12	Size of India	I
8	Geographica	Strabo	II.1.4	Size of India	I
9	Indica (Arrian)	Arrian	III. 7–8.	Size of India	I
10	Geographica	Strabo	II.1.19	Ursa Major and shadows	I
11	Natural History	Pliny	VI. 22.6.	Ursa Major	I
12	Geographica	Strabo	XV.1.20	Fertile soil	I
13	Geographica	Strabo	XV.1.37	Wild animals	I
14	De Natura Animalium	Claudius Aelianus	XVII 39.	Indian apes	I
15	De Natura Animalium	Claudius Aelianus	XVI. 41	Winged scorpions and serpents	I
16	Geographica	Strabo	XV.1.56	Animals of India, and the Reed	I
17	De Natura Animalium	Claudius Aelianus	XVI. 20.21	Animals of India	I
18	Natural History	Pliny	VIII. 14. 1	Boa constrictor	I
19	De Natura Animalium	Claudius Aelianus	VIII.7	Of the Electric Eel.	I
20	Natural History	Pliny	VI.24.1	Taprobane	I
21	Antigon. Caryst.	Antigonus of Carystus	647	Marine trees	I
22	Indica (Arrian)	Arrian	4. 2–13.	Indus and Ganges	I
23	Natural History	Pliny	VI. 21.9-22. 1.	Indus and Ganges	I
24	Polyhistor	Gaius Julius Solinus	52. 6–7.	Indus and Ganges	I
25	Indica (Arrian)	Arrian	6. 2–3.	Silas river	I
26	Anecdota Graeca	Jean François Boissonade de Fontarabie	I. p. 419,	Silas river	I
27	Geographica	Strabo	XV.1.38	Silas river	I
28	Indica (Arrian)	Arrian	5. 2	Number of Indian rivers	I
29	Geographica	Strabo	XV.1.35-36	Pataliputra city	II
30	Indica (Arrian)	Arrian	10	Pataliputra and Indian manners	II
31	Geographica	Strabo	XV.1.53-56	Indian manners	II
32	Varia Historia	Claudius Aelianus	iv.1.	Indian manners	II
33	Nicol. Damasc.	Nicolaus of Damascus	44	Indian manners	II
34	Sermones	Stobaeus	42	Indian manners	II
35	Deipnosophistae	Athenaeus	iv. p. 153.	Indian suppers	II
36	Geographica	Strabo	XV.1.57	Extraordinary tribes	II
37	Natural History	Pliny	VII. ii. 14-22	Extraordinary races	II
38	Polyhistor	Gaius Julius Solinus	52. 26-30	Extraordinary races	II
39	On the Face in the Moon (de facie in orbe lunae) in Moralia	Plutarch	Opp. ed. Reisk, tom. ix. p. 701.	Race of mouthless humans	II
40	Indica (Arrian)	Arrian	Xl.l.-XII.-9	7 castes of India	III
41	Geographica	Strabo	XV.1.39-41	7 castes of India	III
42	Geographica	Strabo	XV.1.50-52	Administration of public affairs; horses and elephants.	III
43	De Natura Animalium	Claudius Aelianus	XIII. 10.	Horses and elephants	III
44	Geographica	Strabo	XV.1.41-43	Elephants	III
45	Indica (Arrian)	Arrian	ch. 13–14.	Elephants	III
46	De Natura Animalium	Claudius Aelianus	XII. 44.	Elephants	III
47	De Natura Animalium	Claudius Aelianus	XIII. 7.	Of the diseases of Elephants.	III
48	Geographica	Strabo	XV.1.44	Gold-digging ants	III
49	Indica (Arrian)	Arrian	XV.5-7.	Gold-digging ants	III
50	Orations	Dio Chrysostom	Or. 35	Gold-digging ants	III
51	Geographica	Strabo	XV.1.58-60	Indian philosophers	III
52	Stromata	Clement of Alexandria	I. p. 305 D	Indian philosophers	III
53	Praeparatio evangelica	Eusebius	IX. 6	Indian philosophers	III
54	Contra Julianum (Against Julian)	Cyril of Alexandria	IV	Indian philosophers	III
55	Stromata	Clement of Alexandria	I	Indian philosophers	III
56	Geographica	Strabo	XV.1.68	Indian philosophers: Kalanos (Calanus) and Mandanis	III
57	The Anabasis of Alexander	Arrian	VII ii. 3-9	Indian philosophers: Kalanos (Calanus) and Mandanis	III
58	Geographica	Strabo	XV.1.68	Indians had not attacked anyone or faced external attacks; Dionysos and Herakles	IV
59	Indica (Arrian)	Arrian	V. 4–12.	Indians had not attacked anyone or faced external attacks; Dionysos and Herakles	IV
60	Contra Apion	Josephus	I. 20 (T. II p. 451, Havere.)	King of the Babylonians surpassed Herakles in greatness	IV
61	Antiquitates Judaicae	Josephus	X. ii. 1 (T. I p. 533, Havere.)	King of the Babylonians surpassed Herakles in greatness	IV
62	Zonar. Annal. Basileae 1557			King of the Babylonians surpassed Herakles in greatness	IV
63	G. Syncell. T. I.	George Syncellus???	p. 419, ed. Benn. (p. 221 ed. Paris, p. 177 ed. Venet.)	King of the Babylonians surpassed Herakles in greatness	IV
64	Fragments of Abydenus's writings in Praeparatio evangelica	Eusebius	I. 41 (ed. Colon. 1688, p. 456 D)	King of the Babylonians surpassed Herakles in greatness	IV
65	Indica (Arrian)	Arrian	7–9.	King of the Babylonians surpassed Herakles in greatness	IV
66	Natural History	Pliny	IX. 5	Pearls	IV
67	Mirabilia	Phlegon of Tralles	33	Pandaian land	IV
68	Natural History	Pliny	VI. xxi. 4–5.	Ancient history of Indians	IV
69	Polyhistor	Gaius Julius Solinus	52. 5.	Ancient history of Indians	IV
70	The Anabasis of Alexander	Arrian	VII. ii. 3–9.	Indian philosophers: Kalanos (Calanus) and Mandanis	IV
71	De Natura Animalium	Claudius Aelianus	XII. 8.	Elephants	(Doubtful fragments)
72	De Natura Animalium	Claudius Aelianus	III. 46.	White elephant	(Doubtful fragments)
73	De recta in Deum fide	?Adamantius (Pseudo-Origen)	vol. I. p. 904.	Brachhmans (Brahmins) and their philosophy	(Doubtful fragments)
74	De gentibus Indiae et Bragmanibus	Palladius of Galatia	pp. 8, 20 et seq. ed. Londin. 1668.	Indian philosophers: Kalanos (Calanus) and Mandanis	(Doubtful fragments)
75	De moribus Brachmanorum	Ambrose	pp. 62, 68 et seq. ed. Pallad. Londin. 1668.	Calanus and Mandanis	(Doubtful fragments)
76	Natural History	Pliny	VI. 21. 8-23. 11.	Indian races	(Doubtful fragments)
77	Polyhistor	Gaius Julius Solinus	52. 6–17.	Catalogue of Indian Races.	(Doubtful fragments)
78	Stratagems	Polyaenus	I. 1. 1–3.	Dionysos	(Doubtful fragments)
79	Stratagems	Polyaenus	I. 3. 4.	Hercules and Pandaea	(Doubtful fragments)
80	De Natura Animalium	Claudius Aelianus	XVI. 2-22.	Beasts of India	(Doubtful fragments)

== Indica according to the reconstructed text ==
According to the text reconstructed by J. W. McCrindle (1877) and Richard Stoneman (2022), Megasthenes' Indica describes India as follows:

=== Geography ===
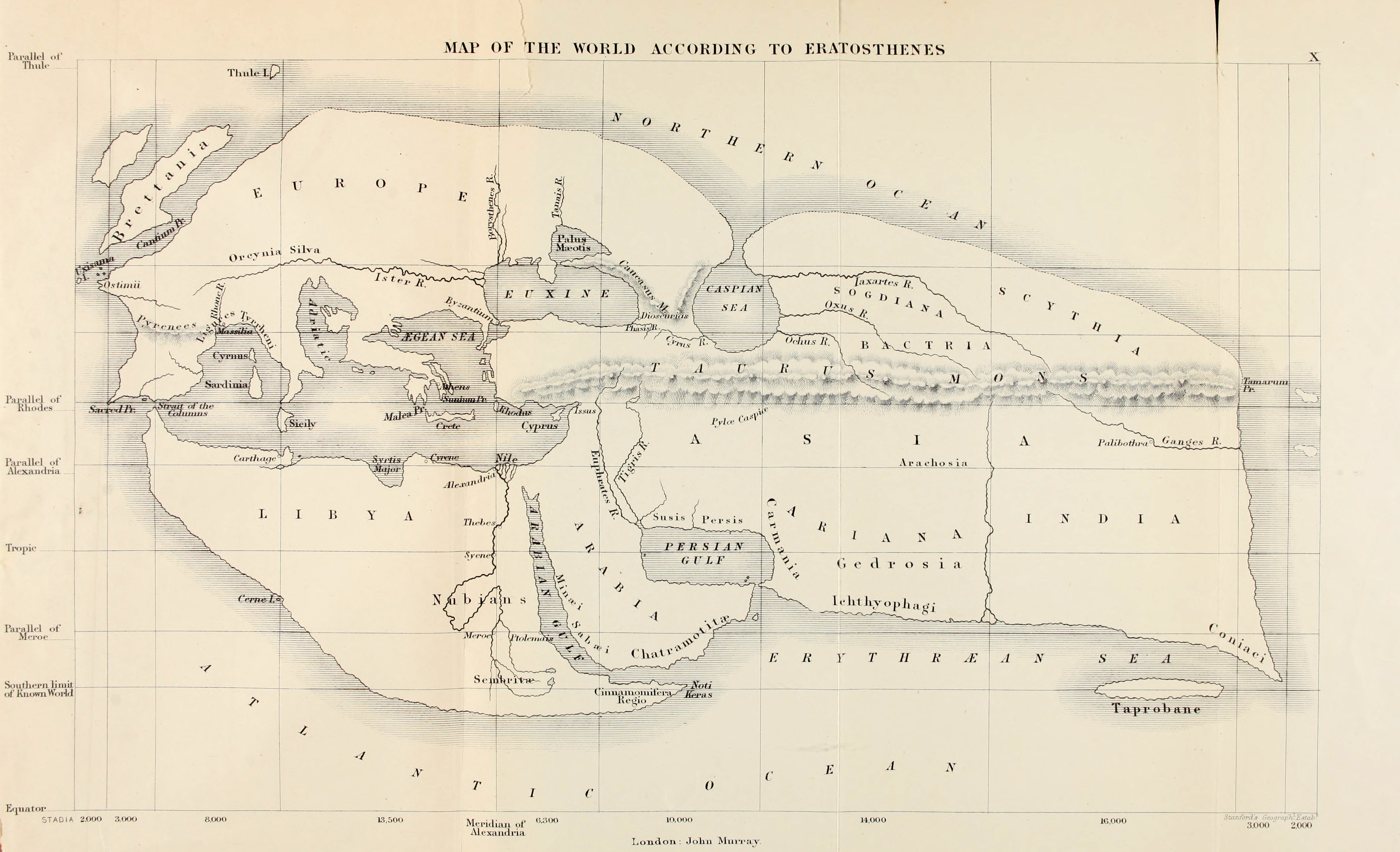
An 1883 reconstruction of Eratosthenes' map depicts the world as known to the Greeks around Megasthenes' time. India is shown as a quadrilateral-shaped country in the bottom right.

India is a quadrilateral-shaped country, bounded by the Great Sea in the east and the south, Indus River in the west, and Emodus (Note: "Emodus" (or "Hemodus") refers to the Hindu Kush, Pamir, and the Himalayas taken as a single mountain range; the word is derived from the Indian term Haimavata, meaning "covered with snow".) mountain in the north. Beyond the Emodus lies the Sacae-inhabited part of Scythia. Besides Scythia, the countries of Bactria and Ariana border India. India's northern border reaches the extremities of the Tauros. From Ariana to the Eastern Sea, it is bound by mountains that are called the Kaukasos by the Macedonians. The various native names for these mountains include Parapamisos, Hemodus (or Emodus) and Himaos.

The area of India is said to span 28,000 stades from west to east, and 32,000 from north to south. Because of its large size, India is "thought to encompass a larger stretch of the sun's course in summer than any other part of the world". In many of the extreme points of India, a gnomon of the sundial casts no shadow, and the Bears (Ursa Major and Ursa Minor) are not visible at night. In the furthest parts, the pole star is not visible, and it is said that the shadows incline to the south.

India has many large and navigable rivers, which rise in the northern mountains, and flow through the plains. Many of these rivers merge into the Ganges, which is 30 stadia wide at its source, and runs from north to south. The Ganges empties into the ocean that forms the southern boundary of Gandaridae (Gangadarai). The country of Gandaridae has the highest number and the largest elephants in India, because of which other nations are afraid of its strength, and no foreign king has been able to conquer it. Even Alexander of Macedon, who subdued all of Asia and defeated all the other Indians, refrained from making war against Gandaridae when he learned that they had 4,000 war elephants.

The Indus also runs from north to south, and empties into the ocean. It has several navigable tributaries, the most notable ones being Hypanis, the Hydaspes, and the Acesines. (According to a passage of Diodorus traced to Megasthenes, Indus is the world's largest river after Nile. However, according to Arrian, Megasthenes as well as other writers wrote that Ganges is much larger than Indus.)

One peculiar river is the Sillas, which originates from a fountain of the same name. Everything cast into this river sinks down to the bottom – nothing floats in it. In addition, there are a large number of other rivers, supplying abundant water for agriculture. According to the native philosophers and natural scientists, this is because the bordering countries (Scythia, Bactria, and Ariana) are more elevated than India, so their waters run down to India.

=== History ===
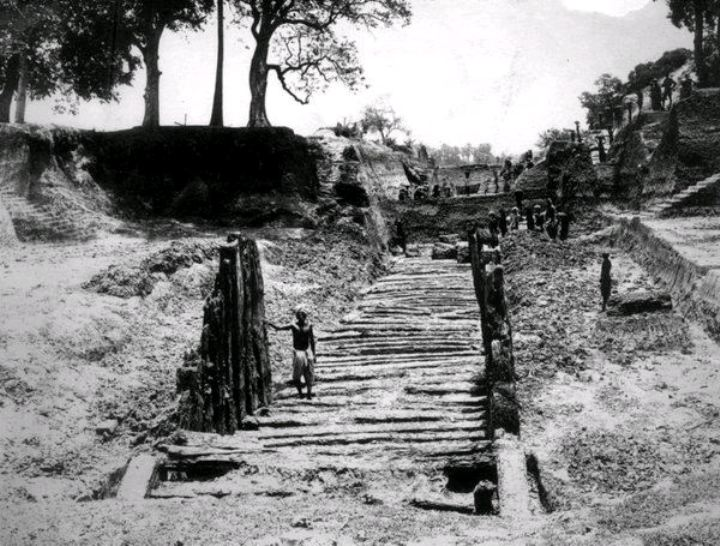
Mauryan remains of a wooden palissade at Bulandi Bagh site of Pataliputra.

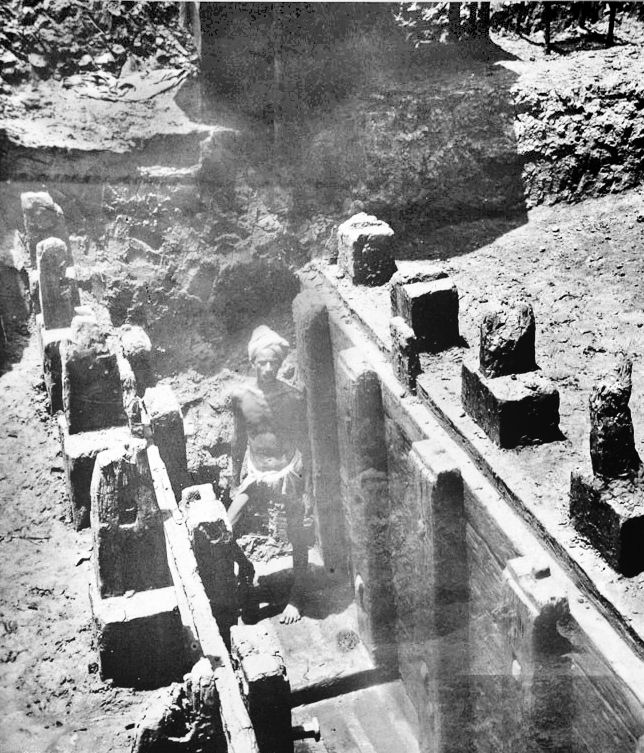
Mauryan remains of a wooden palissade at Bulandi Bagh site of Pataliputra.

In the primitive times, the Indians lived on fruits and wore clothes made of animal skin, just like the Greeks. The most learned Indian scholars say that Dionysus invaded India, and conquered it. When his army was unable to bear the excessive heat, he led his soldiers to the mountains called Meros for recovery; this led to the Greek legend about Dionysus being bred in his father's thigh (meros in Greek). (Note: Diodorus speculates that there may have been multiple gods named Dionysus, the most ancient of whom was an Indian. Modern scholars have theorized that the ancient Greeks conflated their god Dionysus with an Indian deity or cultural hero, such as Indra, Krishna, a Munda god, or Prithu. For example, historian D. R. Patil suggests that the Rigvedic deity Prithu was associated with Dionysus.) Dionysus taught Indians several things including how to grow plants, make wine and worship. He founded several large cities, introduced laws and established courts. For this reason, he was regarded as a deity by the Indians. He ruled entire India for 52 years, before dying of old age. His descendants ruled India for several generations, before being dethroned and replaced by democratic city-states.

The Indians who inhabit the hill country also claim that Herakles was one of them. Like the Greeks, they characterize him with the club and the lion's skin. According to them, Herakles was a powerful man who subjugated evil beasts. He had several sons and one daughter, who became rulers in different parts of his dominion. He founded several cities, the greatest of which was Palibothra (Pataliputra). Herakles built several places in this city, fortified it with water-filled trenches and settled a number of people in the city. His descendants ruled India for several generations, but never launched an expedition beyond India. After several years, the royal rule was replaced by democratic city states, although there existed a few kings when Alexander invaded India.

=== Fauna ===
India has a variety of animals, many of which are exceptionally large and strong. India has the highest number of domesticated elephants, and Indians hunt and trained them for warfare. Because of availability of a great amount of food, the Indian elephants are the largest in the world, and stronger than the Libyan elephants. The gestation period of the elephants ranges from 16 to 18 months, and the oldest of the elephants live up to 200 years.

=== Economy ===
The land of India produces every kind of metal suitable for adornment, military requipment and other use. It has a great amount of silver and gold, a substantial amount of bronze and iron, and also tin and other metals.

India has several mountains with a variety of fruit trees. It also has many beautiful cultivated plains, which are irrigated by a large number of rivers. Most of the country is well-watered, and is able to produce two crops a year, since rain falls in both summer and winter. The major crops include wheat (crop of Demeter), millet, many great-quality pulses, rice, a crop called bosporos, fruits and other plants that are useful as food. At the time of summer solstice, the following crops are sown: rice, bosporos, sesame, and millet. During winter, wheat is sown, as in other countries.

No famines have ever occurred in India because of the following reasons:

- The Indians are always assured of at least one of the two seasonal crops; in most years, both crops succeed
- A number of remarkably sweet fruits grow in wild, and roots grow in marshy places
- The food plants grow in abundance in plains because of water from many rivers, the remarkably regular annual rain cycle, and the heat that ripens the roots in the marshes
- The Indian warriors regard those engaged in agriculture and animal husbandry as sacred. Unlike warriors in many other countries, they do not destroy farms or harm farm workers during wars. The warriors do not burn down the enemy lands with fire or cut down their trees.

=== Food and clothing ===
Indian beverage is a liquor composed from rice instead of barley. When the Indians are at supper, a table is placed before each person, this being like a tripod. There is placed upon it golden bowls, into which they first put rice, boiled as one would boil barley, and then they add many dainties prepared according to Indian recipes. Indians never drink wine except in sacrifice.

In contrast to the general simplicity of their style, they prize finery and ornament. Their robes are worked in gold, and ornamented with precious stones, and they wear also flowered garments made of the finest muslin. Some have attendants walking behind them hold up umbrellas over them: for they have a high regard for beauty, and avail themselves of every device to improve their looks.

=== Society ===
Because of its large size, India is inhabited by many diverse races, all of which are indigenous. India has no foreign colony, and Indians have not established any colonies outside India.

Like its animals, the humans of India are also "exceptional in stature and bulk" because of abundance of crops. They are also technically accomplished, because of pure air and clean water. They are well-skilled in art.

A law, prescribed by ancient Indian philosophers, bans slavery. The law treats everyone equally, but allows the property to be unevenly distributed.

The population of India is divided into 7 endogamous and hereditary castes:

1. Philosophers
  - Not numerous compared to other castes, but most prominent
  - Exempted from all public duties
  - Neither masters, nor servants
  - "believed to be most dear to the gods, and to be the most conversant with matters pertaining to Hades"
  - Engaged by others to offer sacrifices and perform funerary rites, for which they received valuable gifts and privileges
  - At the beginning of the year, they make prophecies about droughts, rain storms, propitious winds, diseases and other topics. Based on these prophecies, the citizens and the rulers make adequate preparations. A philosopher whose prophecy fails receives strong criticism and has to observe silence for the rest of his life, but otherwise incurs no penalty.
2. Farmers
  - Most numerous of all castes
  - Live in villages, and avoid visiting towns
  - Exempted from fighting and other public duties
  - Regarded as public benefactors, and protected from damage during wars, even by enemy warriors
  - Pay a land tribute to the ruler, the official land owner
  - In addition, they remit 1/4th of their produce to the state treasury
3. Herders
  - Live in tents, outside villages and towns
  - Hunt and trap crop-destroying birds and animals
  - involved in animal husbandry
4. Artisans
  - Create weapons as well as tools for farmers and others
  - Exempted from paying taxes, and receive a maintenance from the state exchequer
5. Military
  - Second most numerous among the castes
  - Well-organized and equipped for war
  - Indulge in amusements and idleness during peaceful times
  - Maintained at state expense, along with war horses and elephants
6. Overseers
  - Carry out administrative tasks
  - Report to the king or (in states not ruled by kings) magistrates
7. Councillors and Assessors
  - Composed of wise people with good character
  - Deliberate on public affairs; include the royal advisers, state treasurers, dispute arbitrators; the army generals and chief magistrates also usually belong to this class.
  - Least numerous, but most respected

=== Philosophy ===
Megasthenes divides the Indian philosophers into two kinds - one of which he calls the Brachmanes, and the other the Sarmanes. Of the Sarmanes he states that the Hylobioi (Gymnosophist) are the most honored. The next most honoured are the physicians, since they are engaged in the study of the nature of man. Besides these there are diviners and sorcerers. Women pursue philosophy with some of them.

Megasthenes also comments on the presence of pre-Socratic views among the Brahmans in India and Jews in Syria. Five centuries later Clement of Alexandria, in his Stromateis, may have misunderstood Megasthenes to be responding to claims of Greek primacy by admitting Greek views of physics were preceded by those of Jews and Indians. Megasthenes, like Numenius of Apamea, was simply comparing the ideas of the different ancient cultures.

=== Treatment of foreigners ===
The foreigners are treated well. Special officers are appointed to ensure that no foreigner is harmed, and judges hand out harsh punishment to those who take unfair advantage of the foreigners. Sick foreigners are attended by physicians and taken care of. Foreigners who die in India are buried, and their property is delivered to their relatives.

== Historical reliability ==
Later writers such as Arrian, Strabo, Diodorus, and Pliny refer to Indica in their works. Of these writers, Arrian speaks most highly of Megasthenes, while Strabo and Pliny treat him with less respect.

The first century Greek writer Strabo called both Megasthenes and his succeeding ambassador Deimachus liars, and stated that "no faith whatever" could be placed in their writings. The Indica contained numerous fantastical stories, such as those about tribes of people with no mouths, unicorns and other mythical animals, and gold-digging ants. Strabo directly contradicted these descriptions, assuring his readers that Megasthenes' stories, along with his recounting of India's founding by Hercules and Dionysus, were mythical with little to no basis in reality. Despite such shortcomings, some authors believe that Indica is creditworthy, and is an important source of information about the contemporary Indian society, administration and other topics.

According to Paul J. Kosmin, Indica served a legitimizing purpose for Seleucus I and his actions in India. It depicts contemporary India as an unconquerable territory, arguing that Dionysus was able to conquer India, because before his invasion, India was a primitive rural society. Dionysus' urbanization of India makes India a powerful, impregnable nation. The later ruler — the Indian Herakles — is presented as a native of India, despite similarities with the Greek Heracles. This, according to Kosmin, is because now India is shown as unconquerable. Megasthenes emphasizes that no foreign army had been able to conquer India (since Dionysus) and Indians had not invaded a foreign country either. This representation of India as an isolated, invincible country is an attempt to vindicate Seleucus' peace treaty with the Indian emperor through which he abandoned territories he could never securely hold, stabilized the East, and obtained elephants with which he could turn his attention against his great western rival, Antigonus Monophthalmus.

Megasthenes states that there were no slaves in India, but the Arthashastra attests to the existence of slavery in contemporary India; Strabo also counters Megasthenes's claim based on a report from Onesicritus. Historian Shireen Moosvi theorizes that slaves were outcastes, and were not considered members of the society at all. According to historian Romila Thapar, the lack of sharp distinction between slaves and others in the Indian society (unlike the Greek society) may have confused Megasthenes: Indians did not use large-scale slavery as a means of production, and slaves in India could buy back their freedom or be released by their master.

Megasthenes mentions seven castes in India, while the Indian texts mention only four social classes (varnas). According to Thapar, Megasthenes' categorization appears to be based on economic divisions rather than the social divisions; this is understandable because the varnas originated as economic divisions. Thapar also speculates that he wrote his account some years after his visit to India, and at this time, he "arrived at the number seven, forgetting the facts as given to him". Alternatively, it is possible that the later authors misquoted him, trying to find similarities with the Egyptian society, which according to Herodotus was divided into seven social classes.

Megasthenes claims that before Alexander, no foreign power had invaded or conquered Indians, with the exception of the mythical heroes Hercules and Dionysus. However, it is known from earlier sources – such as Herodotus and the inscriptions of Darius the Great – that the Achaemenid Empire included parts of north-western part of India (present-day Pakistan). It is possible that the Achaemenid control did not extend much beyond the Indus River, which Megasthenes considered to be the border of India. Another possibility is that Megasthenes intended to understate the power of the Achaemenid Empire, a rival of the Greeks.
