= Indica (Arrian) =

Book by Arrian

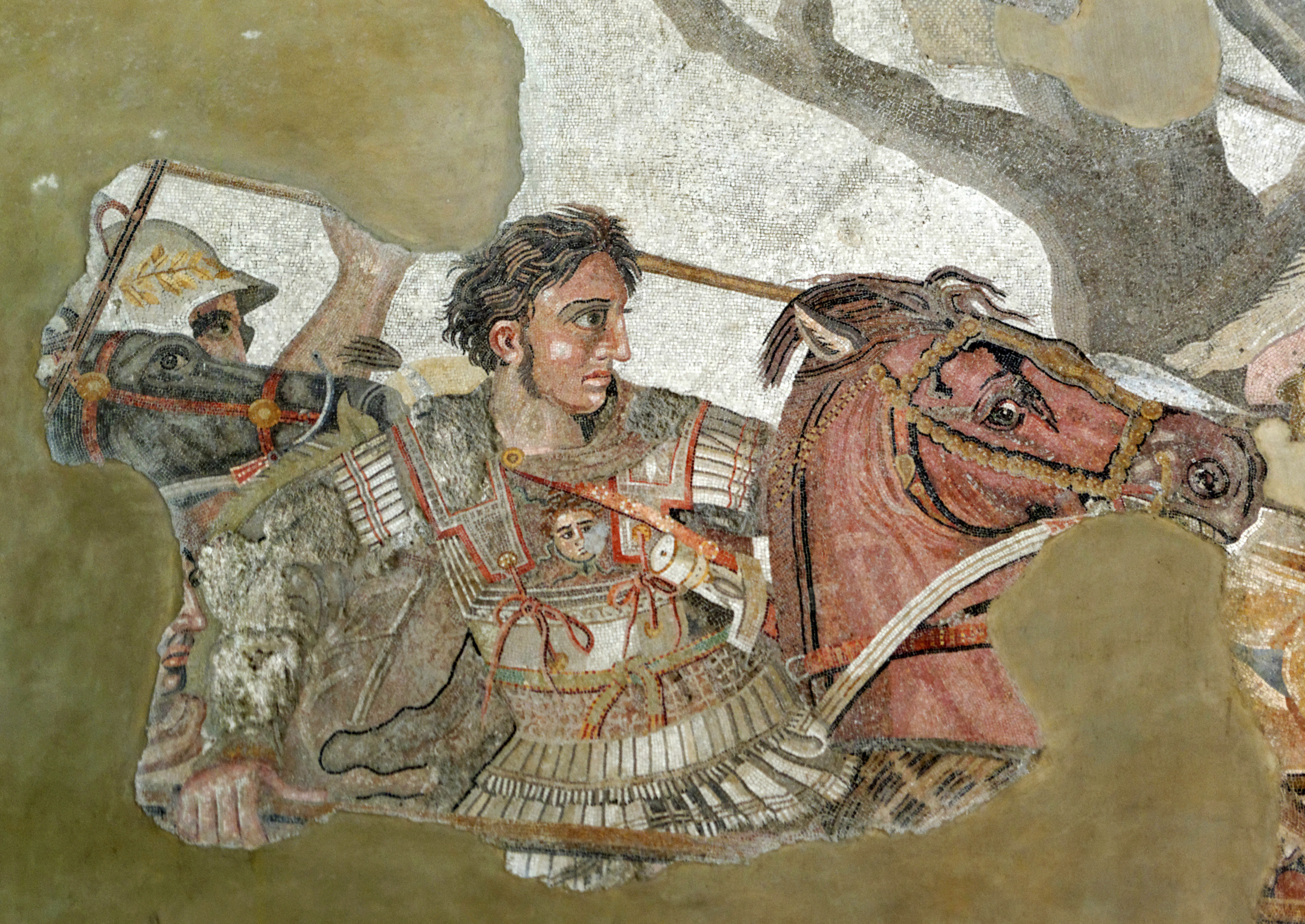
Alexander the Great in battle against the Persian King Darius (Pompeiian mosaic, probably after a lost painting from the 3rd century BCE, not from Indica by Arrian.)

Indica (Ancient Greek: Ἰνδική Indikḗ) is the name of a short military history about interior Asia, particularly India, written by Arrian in the 2nd century CE. The subject of the book is the expedition of Alexander the Great that occurred between 336 and 323 BCE, about 450 years before Arrian. The book mainly tells the story of Alexander's officer Nearchus' voyage from India to the Persian Gulf after Alexander the Great's conquest of the Indus Valley, which was explored in Arrian's earlier text, Anabasis, meant to be the companion text to the Indica. However, much of the importance of the work comes from Arrian's in-depth asides describing the history, geography, and culture of Ancient India. Arrian wrote his Indica in the Ionic dialect, taking Herodotus for his literary mode.

Arrian was born in 86 CE, did not visit the Indian subcontinent, and the book is based on a variety of legends and texts known to Arrian, such as the Indica by Megasthenes. Of all ancient Greek records available about Alexander and interior Asia, Arrian's texts are considered most authoritative.

== Historical period ==
During the period of the events of the Indica, much of what was known of the state of Greece besides Alexander the Great's expedition into India was known due to Alexander himself and his various conquests. As there was little requiring Alexander to stay himself in Macedonia, he was able to venture East. His early military show of force acted to stabilize the region by bringing disparate city states under his control and with this power he was able to control resources of the different regions to provide soldiers and support for his military ambition to attack Persia.

After Alexander's expedition in the Indus Valley, he sought to return to the center of his empire in Babylon. Alexander planned to return himself over land but wanted to learn about the mouth of the Indus (which he himself did not reach) and the sea between India and Babylon. Therefore, he sent one of his officers, Nearchus, to perform such a voyage and report what he saw. Indica describes what Nearchus saw on that voyage.

== Background on author ==
Indica was written by Arrian, a Greek historian, public servant, military commander and philosopher of the Roman period. Arrian's work is considered the best source on the campaigns of Alexander the Great.

=== Arrian's sources ===
Along with the application of reports of the journey taken by Nearchus, Arrian credits use and comparison of works by ancient figures Eratosthenes, Megasthenes, Ctesias, and Onesicritus, all of whom had written some on India. Eratosthenes, an author and geographer, in particular, was described as having documented locations and created a map, despite this, it is not explained in the text whether he traversed India himself. The context provided in the case of the creation of Eratosthenes' map and the corresponding information learned of him by Arrian leaves out the certainty that Eratosthenes is reliable as a source, requiring further knowledge of the geographer.

Despite the availability of other works and accounts by authors who, too, had knowledge of India, such as Artemidorus of Ephesus, Arrian claims only the information of older figures as source material. The account of Nearchus - the author's main source - is now mostly lost, but it appears that Arrian had an extant and complete copy in his own time.

== Synopsis ==
Much of the beginning of the text gives context on India as known by the Greeks and Romans at the time, not delving into the journey of Nearchus until later in the story. The story begins with an explanation of the geography of India, focusing on the size of the rivers Indus and the Ganges, together with their tributaries. A comparison is also made with the Danube and the Nile, illustrating an interest of the author in connections between the Greek world and newly explored areas. Arrian discusses the peoples of India already known to the Greeks and recalls their defining cultural traits as having been influenced by the god Dionysus.

Arrian describes less about India's country and people, instead focusing on contributing factors of Greek culture and mythology as being responsible for what was known of India at the time. The passages of the book leading up to the lengthy rendition of the locations - described and visited one after another by officer Nearchus - in India frequently find the nature of Indian culture as having been left behind or as remnants of once-visiting gods Heracles and Dionysus.

The overall social structure of the Indian people is explored, with a caste system of seven different roles employed: these include gurus, farmers, herdsmen, craftsmen, soldiers, inspectors, and advisors. Arrian briefly compares several to roles in Greek culture, such as Indian gurus to Greek oracles. The text details the natives' manner of hunting (which includes a description of many of the great fauna of India), namely of the elephant, and making war.

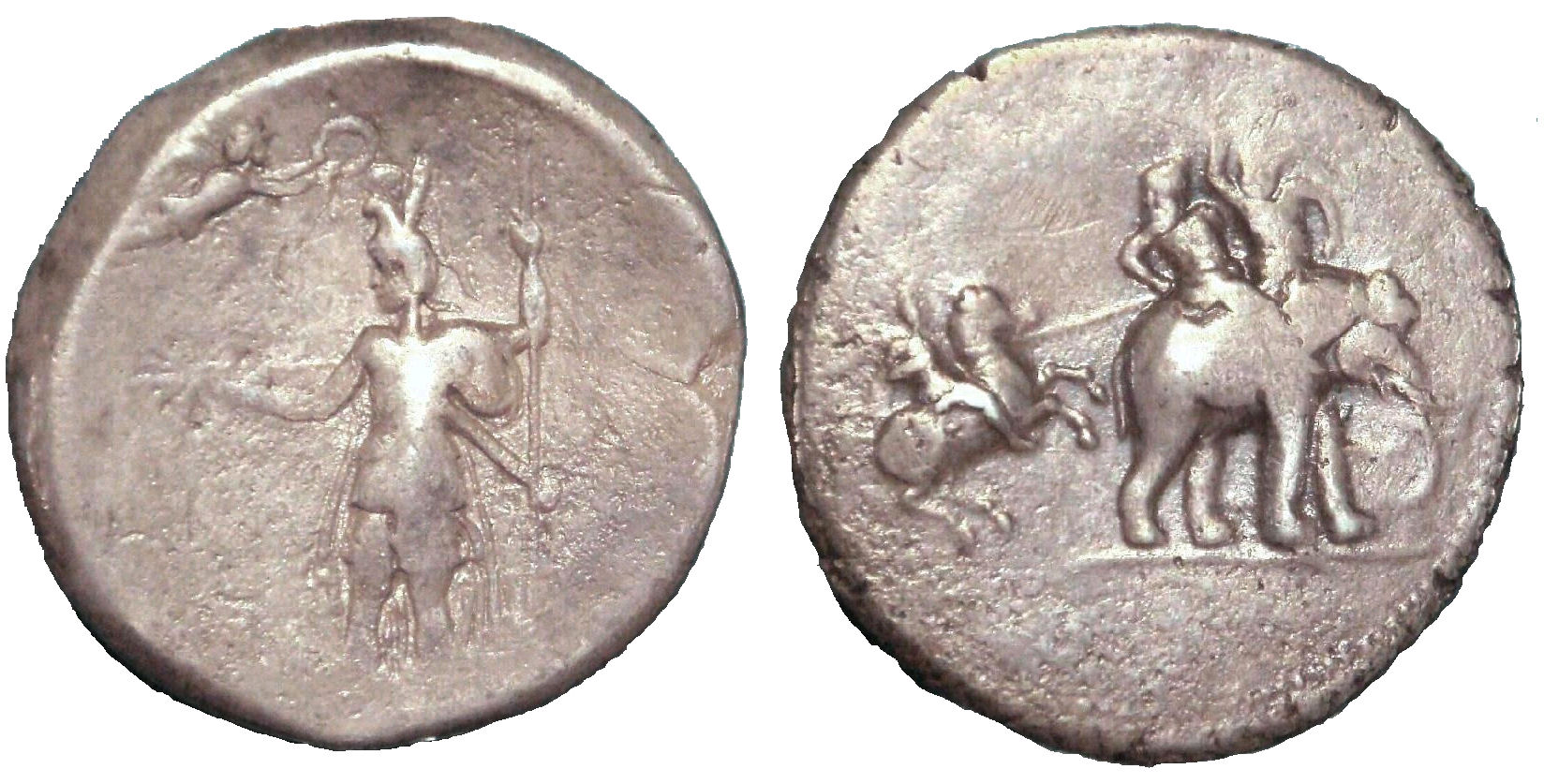
Images of two sides of a coin with an elephant attributed to Alexander the Great.

Arrian writes of some of the animals learned about on Nearchus' journey, including the elephant, tiger and parrot. The author describes not only the elephant but the ways in which the Indian people go about trapping it in great depth, alluding to the importance of this animal in Indian culture.

While the beginning of the text says little about what is happening with Nearchus, it is explained that Alexander of Macedonia planned to sail with his accompanying men and ships down the Hydaspes River. Although he was to sail this way, he wished to have someone else travel opposite of him so as to find and report all outstanding features of the coast and country. After being convinced, he had his officer Nearchus sail opposite of him from the Indus River delta so as to cover all of the Indian coastline and achieve his goal of gaining knowledge of the land and peoples.

The text then moves into the story of Nearchus' voyage from India to Babylon following the conquests of Alexander. From this point onwards, the text mostly tells the story of a naval adventure. However, Arrian leaves the main story from time to time to tell in detail about the various peoples that lived along the way, as of the Ichthyophagi. Occasionally, Arrian describes Nearchus' soldiers' battles with the local people.

The book ends with Nearchus meeting up with Alexander the Great, who had been conducting his own land voyage from India to Susa. Nearchus is congratulated for a safe journey and rewarded for his efforts.

=== Locations visited ===
In order, the destinations described by Arrian on the journey taken by Nearchus, beginning at the Indus River delta (unless otherwise specified, the nature or setting of each location was not given in the text, with most modern names unknown):

Point in Trip	Named location/area in text in order by which they were mentioned	Context	Modern Location
Start of journey	Indus River	With stops or anchorage at Stura, Caumana, and then Coreestis.	
	Crocala Island		
	Bibacta Island, in Sangada		
	Domai Island		
	Saranga		
	Sacala		
	Morontobara		Karachi
	Arabis River		
	Pagala		
	Cabana		
	Cocala		
	Tomerus		Hingol
	Malana		Ras Malan
	Bagisara		
	Colta		
	Calima		
	Carnine Island		
	Cysa village, near Carbis beach		
	Mosarna	A location at which the guide and interpreter Hydraces is recruited.	
	Balomus		
	Barna village		
	Dendrobosa		
	Cophas		
	Cyiza		
	Bageia		
	Talmena		
	Canasis		
	Canate		
	Taa		
	Dagaseira		
	Nosala Island		
	Carmania region, stopping at Badis		
	Maceta, headland into sea		Ras Musandam
	Neoptana beach		
	Anamis River, Harmozia	Located close to Alexander's camp and described shortly before meeting up with him again.	Minab River
Beginning of Return Journey	Islands Organa and Oaracta	At which the guide Mazenes joins.	Hormoz and Qeshm, respectively
Beginning of Return Journey	Pylora Island		
Beginning of Return Journey	Tarsias, a cape		
Beginning of Return Journey	Cataea		Kish
Coast of Persis	Ilas		
Coast of Persis	Caicandrus Island		
Coast of Persis	Ochus Mountain		
Coast of Persis	Apostana		
Coast of Persis	Gogana Coast		
Coast of Persis	Areon		
Coast of Persis	Sitacus River		Mand
Coast of Persis	Town of Hieratis		
Coast of Persis	Heratemis canal		
Coast of Persis	Padargus		
Coast of Persis	Mesambria Peninsula		Bushehr
Coast of Persis	Tacoe		
Coast of Persis	Granis River		
Coast of Persis	Rhogonis		
Coast of Persis	Brizana		
Coast of Persis	Arosis River		
Coast of Susiana	Cataderbis Lake, Margastana Island		
Coast of Susiana	Euphrates River		
Coast of Susiana	Diridotis village, Babylonia		
Coast of Susiana	Pasitigris River		Karun
Coast of Susiana	Tigris River	Other locations Armenia, Ninus, and Mesopotamia were mentioned, but were not visited.	(Ninus) Nineveh
Coast of Susiana	Aginis village		
Coast of Susiana	Susa		

==== Major characters/figures present in the story ====
Alexander the Great, son of Philip II: although present at times, he only appears before the start of Nearchus' journey and towards the end of it on land near the place called Harmozia.

Nearchus, son of Androtimus: the officer entrusted by Alexander himself with bringing the fleet safely to the end of the journey and along the coast, while surveying and exploring the land.

Onesicritus: a figure present in the events of Alexander the Great's campaign accompanying Nearchus into India, described negatively by Arrian who discounts the claims written by the former as farcical.

Leonnatus: responsible for the defeat of the Oreitans - one of the ethnic groups described by Arrian in the text - while the fleet was stopped at Cocala.

Hydraces: an interpreter and guide who aids Nearchus and his men in their travels, although he does not join until later in the book.

Mazenes: another local guide who joins later on in the story.

== Reception ==
The purpose of the Indica by Arrian - although purported by the author as providing information on India and the customs and culture of its people, the natural aspects of the land, and its connections to Greece - has been viewed as centering around the influences and authority of Greek mythology on India and the accomplishments of Alexander the Great. As it is to have been examined in Arrian's time, the text is exceptional in its praises of Alexander - and his aggressive methods of conquest - and the goal of the author more in describing the journey over the description of the land and its peoples, who were written about using the accounts of others such as Nearchus.

The Indica's use as a historical source reflects the knowledge of the Greeks and Romans in the time of Alexander the Great and Nearchus, but does not explain the knowledge gained between that and the time of Arrian's writing. The text itself focuses on the observations and notes of Nearchus about the land he explored, leaning into the locations visited, yet occasionally pausing to consider seemingly unrelated topics or stories. The detailed aside stories in the text are not completely accurate, even described by Arrian as tales provided by previous historians and lacking evidence and the Indica can not be compared with the modern knowledge of the areas and peoples it describes due to these and other discrepancies. However, because local histories of many of the places described in Indica are not extant or widely available, Indica remains a valuable - although disputed - source of information regarding the ancient peoples of, for example, ancient Persia and the Indian subcontinent.

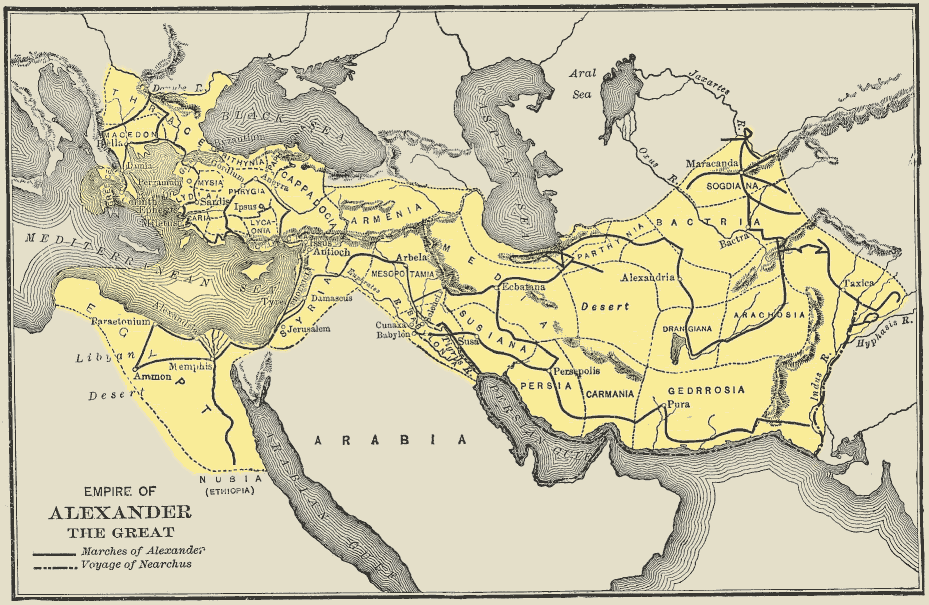
Map of Alexander's empire. Nearchus' journey, described in Indica, is shown as the dotted line through Indian Ocean from the Indus Delta to the Persian Gulf

A large body of knowledge about the Near East, Central Asia, and India reached Greece through the events of the Indica at the time they occurred, through the accounts of Nearchus, and through the writings of Arrian. The text makes clear that Alexander had high hopes for gaining and disseminating knowledge about his empire, with Nearchus' voyage illustrating how Alexander went about learning about the world and gives some insight into the amount of never before exchanged knowledge his conquests resulted in spreading. As information from and about the East continued to move West, the Indica was met with resistance by other authors and historians, even now in modern day. Although Nearchus' journey has been translated in detail by several modern historians, the subject of the journey itself and the direction in which the fleet ventured has been intensely debated, such as by N. G. L. Hammond and J. R. Hamilton who insist on opposite directions.
