= Myrmekes =

Greek word for ants, used in mythology

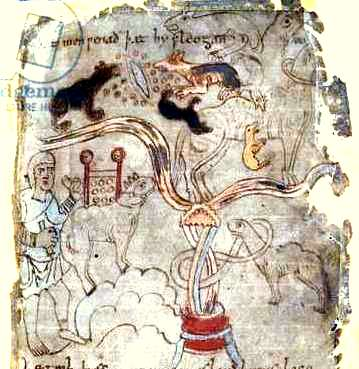
Three dog-like ants attacking a tethered camel, man in a tunic, c. 1000

Myrmekes (Μύρμηκες) is Greek for "ants". Greek mythological animals and tribes were called with this name.

== Mythology ==
Herodotus wrote about gold-digging ants in India which were smaller than dogs but larger than foxes.

Aelian wrote: "The Indian ants (μύρμηκες οἱ Ἰνδικοὶ) which guard the gold will not cross the river Campylinus."

== See also ==
- Gold-digging ant
- Myrmex (Attic woman)
- Myrmidons
