= Gold-digging ant =

Mythical insect

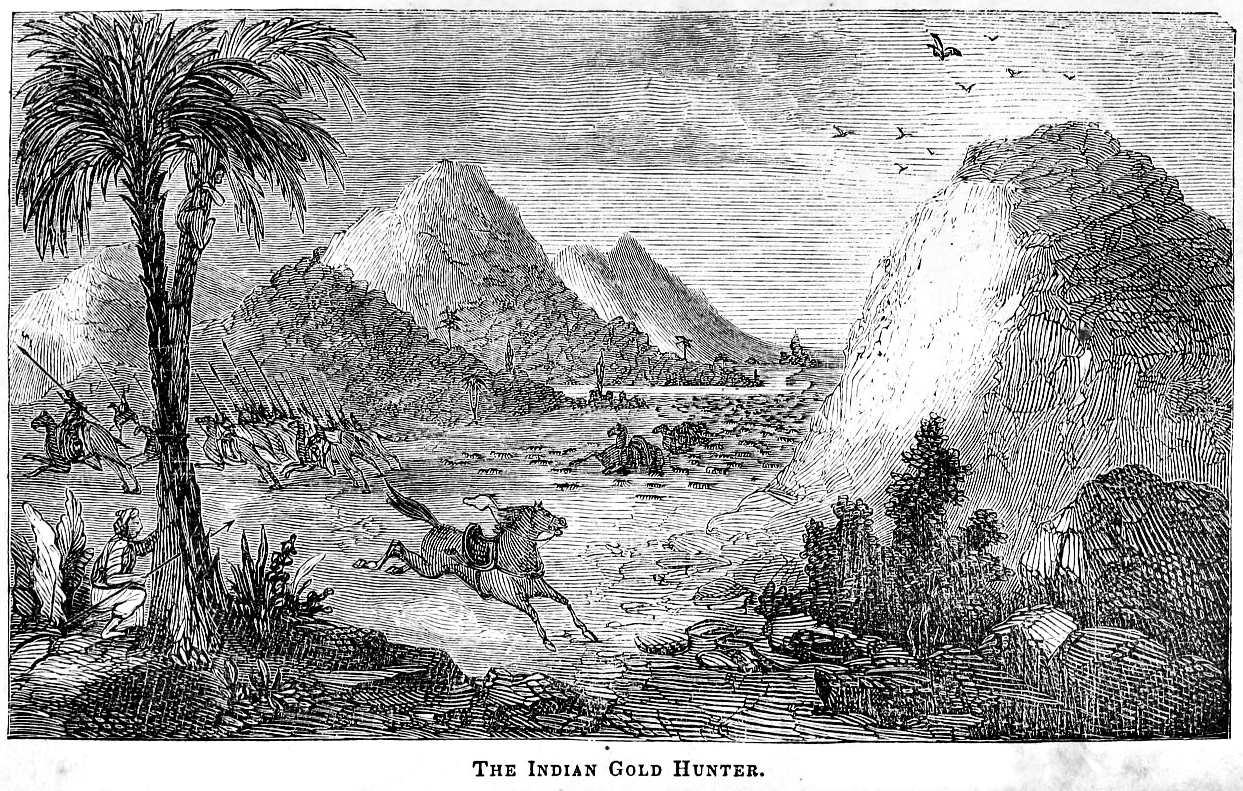
The Indian Gold Hunters, illustration of giant ants chasing Indian gold-hunters, based on the description by Herodotus in Book Three of his Histories

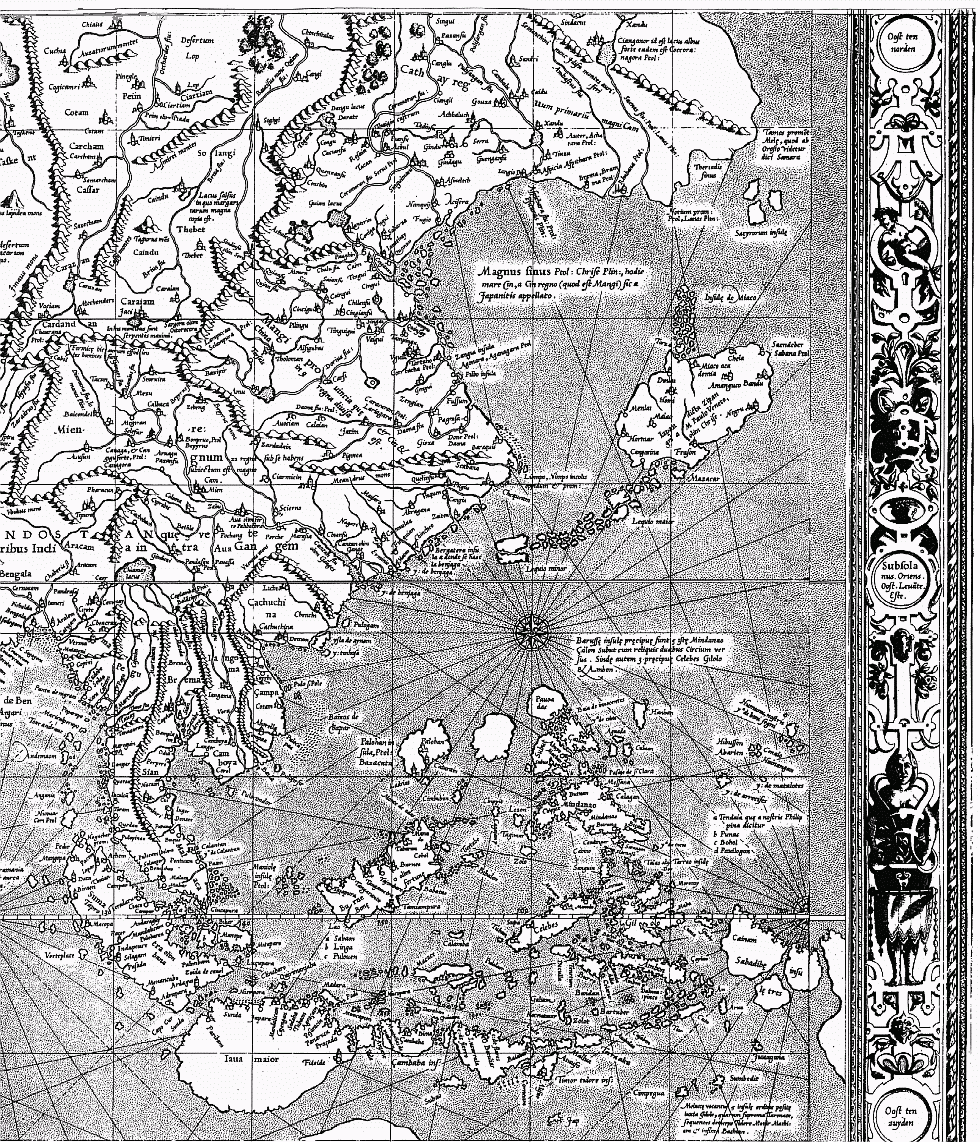
In this sheet of the Mercator 1569 world map, the text Formicae hic aurum effodientes homines sunt ("Here there are men who unearth the gold of ants.") is located at 38°N 127°E between Çardand and Mien.

The gold-digging ant is a mythical insect described in classical and medieval bestiaries. They were dog- or fox-sized ants that dug up gold in sandy areas. Some versions of the Physiologus said they came from Aethiopia, while Herodotus claimed they were located in India. They were also briefly mentioned by Megasthenes in his book Indika.

== Herodotus ==
In Histories (Book 3, sections 102 to 105) Herodotus reports that a species of fox-sized, furry "ants" lives in one of the far eastern, Indian provinces of the Persian Empire. This region, he reports, is a sandy desert, and the sand there contains a wealth of fine gold dust. These giant ants, according to Herodotus, would often unearth the gold dust when digging their mounds and tunnels, and the people living in this province would then collect the precious dust. Herodotus's account was well-known and endorsed in antiquity. For example, in the first century A.D. the Roman natural historian Pliny the Elder writes that he will omit "the Indian gold obtained from ants or the gold dug up by griffins in Scythia" so as to focus on European and near-Eastern methods of gold-mining.

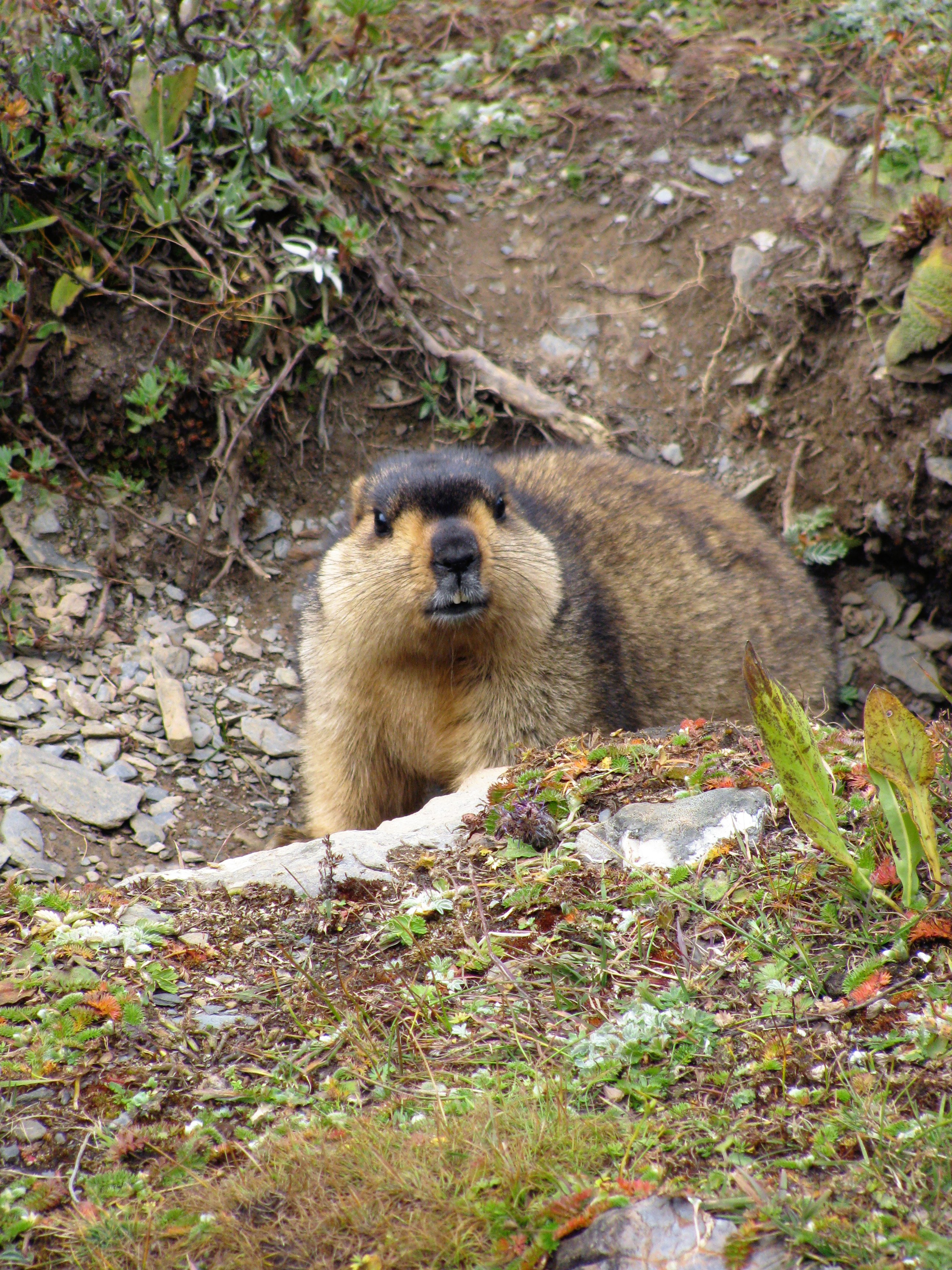
Himalayan marmot in central Asia.

French ethnologist Michel Peissel says that the Himalayan marmot on the Deosai Plateau in Gilgit–Baltistan province of Pakistan, may have been what Herodotus called giant "ants". Much like the province that Herodotus describes, the ground of the Deosai Plateau is rich in gold dust. Peissel interviewed the Minaro tribal people who live in the Deosai Plateau, and they have confirmed that they have, for generations, collected the gold dust that the marmots bring to the surface when digging burrows. The story was widespread in the ancient world and later authors like Pliny the Elder mentioned it in his gold mining section of the Naturalis Historia.

In his book The Ants' Gold: The Discovery of the Greek El Dorado in the Himalayas, Peissel says that Herodotus may have confused the old Persian word for "marmot" with that for "mountain ant" because he probably did not know any Persian and thus relied on local translators when travelling in the Persian Empire. Herodotus did not claim to have seen the gold-digging "ant" creatures; he stated that he was simply reporting what other travellers told him.

== Gold-digging insects ==
A 2011 study by Australian scientists found that termites have been found to excrete trace deposits of gold. According to the CSIRO, the termites burrow beneath eroded subterranean material which typically masks human attempts to find gold, and ingest and bring the new deposits to the surface. They believe that studying termite nests may lead to less invasive methods of finding gold deposits.

== See also ==
- Myrmekes
