= Sillas River =

The Sillas River is a non-existent river that was reported to exist in South Asia by Megasthenes (c. 350 BCE-290 BCE), a Greek traveller and geographer who visited Mauryan India during the third century BCE. According to Megasthenes's book Indika, this river was peculiar since nothing cast into it would float, but strangely would sink to the bottom. No such river has ever been found in India or elsewhere.
