= Arrian =

2nd-century Greek historian, official and philosopher

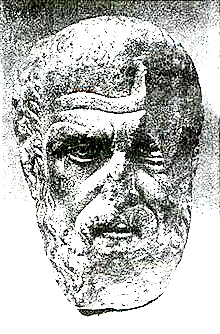
- Unidentified Roman portrait bust, sometimes labeled as Arrian
- Born: Lucius Flavius Arrianus c. 86; Nicomedia, Bithynia, Anatolia
- Died: c. 160 (aged 73–74); Athens
- Occupations: Historian, public servant, military commander and philosopher

Philosophical work
- Notable works: The Anabasis of Alexander; Indica; Periplus of the Euxine Sea

Arrian (/ˈæriən/; Greek: Ἀρριανός Arrianos; Latin: Lucius Flavius Arrianus; c. 86/89 – c. after 146/160 AD), also known as Arrian of Nicomedia, was a Greek historian, public servant, military commander, and philosopher of the Roman period.

The Anabasis of Alexander by Arrian is considered the best source on the campaigns of Alexander the Great. Scholars have generally preferred Arrian to other extant primary sources, though this attitude has changed somewhat in light of modern studies into Arrian's method.

== Arrian's life ==
Arrian was born in Nicomedia (present-day İzmit), the provincial capital of Bithynia. Cassius Dio called him Flavius Arrianus Nicomediensis. Sources provide similar dates for his birth, within a few years prior to 90, 89, and 85–90 AD. The line of reasoning for dates belonging to 85–90 AD is because of Arrian being made a consul around 130 AD, and the usual age for this, during this period, being 42 years of age. (ref. pp. 312, & SYME 1958, ibid.). His family was from the Greek provincial aristocracy, and his full name, L. Flavius Arrianus, indicates that he was a Roman citizen, suggesting that the citizenship went back several generations, probably to the time of the Roman conquest some 170 years before.

Sometime during the second century AD (117 to 120 AD) while in Epirus, probably Nicopolis, Arrian attended lectures of Epictetus of Nicopolis, and proceeded within a time to fall into his pupillage, a fact attested to by Lucian. All that is known about the life of Epictetus is due to Arrian, in that Arrian left an Encheiridion (Handbook) of Epictetus' philosophy. After Epirus, he went to Athens, and while there, he became known as the "young Xenophon" as a consequence of the similarity of his relationship to Epictetus as Xenophon had to Socrates.

For a period, some time about 126 AD, he was a friend of the emperor Hadrian's, who appointed him to the Senate. He was appointed to the position consul suffectus around 130 AD, and then, in 132 AD (although Howatson shows 131), he was made prefect or legate (governor) of Cappadocia by Hadrian, a service he continued for six years. Historian Cassius Dio states that not long after the Bar Kokhba revolt in Judea had been quelled, in 135 AD, King Pharasmanes II of Iberia caused the Alani to invade neighbouring territories, including Cappadocia, where their advance was robustly halted by Arrian's legions.

A second war was begun by the Alani (they are Massagetae) at the instigation of Pharasmanes. It caused dire injury to the Albanian territory and Media, and then involved Armenia and Cappadocia; after which, as the Alani were not only persuaded by gifts from Vologaesus, but also stood in dread of Flavius Arrianus, the governor of Cappadocia, it came to a stop.

Arrian referred to himself as "the second Xenophon", on account of his reputation and the esteem in which he was held. Lucian stated him to be:

a Roman of the first rank with a life-long attachment to learning

— quote of Lucian in P. E. Easterling, B. M. W. Knox, p. 143

This quality is identified as paideia (παιδεία), which is the quality considered to be of one who is known as an educated and learned personage, i.e., one who is highly esteemed and important.

== Works ==
Alexandri anabasis, 1575

He produced eight extant works (cf. Syvänne, footnote of p. 260). The Indica and the Anabasis are the only works completely intact. His entire remaining oeuvre is known as FGrH 156 to designate those collected fragments that exist.

=== Periplus of the Euxine Sea ===
This work is the earliest extant work that is dated with any confidence. It is a writing addressed to Emperor Hadrian.

=== Discourses of Epictetus and Enchiridion of Epictetus ===
Arrian was a pupil of Epictetus around 108 AD, and, according to his own account, he was moved to publish his notes of Epictetus' lectures, which are known as Discourses of Epictetus, by their unauthorized dissemination. According to George Long, Arrian noted from Epictetus' lectures for his private use and some time later made of these, the Discourses. Photius states that Arrian produced two books the Dissertations and the Discourses. The Discourses are also known as Diatribai and are apparently a verbatim recording of Epictetus' lectures.

The Enchiridion is a short compendium of all Epictetus' philosophical principles. It is also known as a handbook, and A Mehl considers the Enchiridion to have been a vade mecum for Arrian. The Enchiridion is apparently a summary of the Discourses.

JB Stockdale considered that Arrian wrote eight books of which four were lost by the Middle Ages and the remaining ones became the Discourses. In a comparison of the contents of the Enchiridion with the Discourses, it is apparent that the former contains material not present within the latter, suggesting an original lost source for the Enchiridion.

=== Homiliai Epiktetou ===
Friendly conversations with Epictetus (Homiliai Epiktetou) is a 12 book work mentioned by Photius in his Bibliotheca, of which only fragments remain.

=== Anabasis of Alexander ===
The Anabasis of Alexander comprises seven books. Arrian used Xenophon's account of the March of Cyrus as the basis for this work.

=== Ta met' Alexandron ===
History of the Diadochi or Events after Alexander is a work originally of ten books; a commentary on this work was written by Photius (FW Walbank, p. 8).

Three extant fragments are the Vatican Palimpsest (of the 10th century AD), PSI 12.1284 (Oxyrhynchus), and the Gothenburg palimpsest (of the 10th century also), these possibly stemming originally from Photius.

The writing is about the successors of Alexander the Great, circa 323 – 321 or 319.

=== Parthica ===
A lost work of seventeen books, fragments of Parthica were maintained by the Suda and Stephanus of Byzantium. The work survives only in adaptations made later by Photius and Syncellus. Translated, the title is History of the Parthians. Arrian's aim in the work was to set forth events of the Parthian war of Trajan. The writing mentioned that the Parthians trace their origins to Artaxerxes II.

=== Bithyniaca ===
A work of eight books, Bibliotheca (via Photius) states it is the fourth to have been written by Arrian.

=== Indica ===
Indica is a work on a variety of things pertaining to India, and the voyage of Nearchus in the Persian Gulf. The first part of Indica was based largely on the work of the same name of Megasthenes, the second part based on a journal written by Nearchus.

=== Techne Taktike ===
Written 136/137 AD (in the 20th year of Hadrian), Techne Taktike ('the art/craft of tactics') is a treatise on Roman cavalry and military tactics, and includes information on the nature, arms and discipline of the phalanx. The hippika gymnasia is a particular concern of Arrian in the treatise.

Another translation of the title is Ars tactica, which, in Greek, is Τέχνη τακτική.

This work has generally been considered in large part a panegyric to Hadrian, written for the occasion of his vīcennālia, although some scholars have argued that its second half may have had practical use.

=== Kynēgetikos ===
Cynegeticus (Κυνηγετικός), translated as A treatise on hunting with hounds, On Hunting, or On Coursing, is a work about the Celtic sport of coursing hare with sighthounds, specifically the Celtic greyhounds: in Greek (plural) ouertragoi, in Latin (plural) vertragi.

The work was inspired by and designed as an addition to an earlier exposition made by Xenophon, whom Arrian recognised to be the Ancient Greek authority on the subject of hunting with scent hounds.

=== Ektaxis kata Alanon ===
Ektaxis kata Alanon (Ἔκταξις κατὰ Ἀλανῶν) is a work of a now fragmentary nature; the title is translated as Deployment against the Alani or The order of battle against the Alans or referred to simply as Alanica. It is thought not have been written as a presentation of facts but for literary reasons. Pertaining to the relevant historical facts, though, while governor of Cappadocia, Arrian repelled an invasion of the Alani sometime during 135 AD, a struggle in which Arrian's two legions were victorious.

Within the work, Arrian explicitly identified the particular means of pursuing warfare as being based on Greek methods.

Ektaxis kata Alanon is also translated as Acies contra Alanos. The work was known for a time as A History of the Alani (Alanike via Photius). A fragment describing a plan of battle against the Alani was found in Milan around the 17th century which was thought at that time to belong to the History.

=== Biographical series ===
There were also a number of monographs or biographies, including of Dion of Syracuse, Timoleon of Corinth, and Tilliborus, a brigand or robber of Asia Minor, which are now lost.

== Sources, transmission, translations and publications ==
Everything known of his life derives from the 9th century writing of Photius in his Bibliotheca, and from those few references which exist within Arrian's own writings. The knowledge of his consulship, is derived at the least from literature produced by Suidas. Arnobius (c. 3rd century AD) mentions Arrian. Arrian was also known of by Aulus Gellius. Pliny the Younger addressed seven of his epistles to him. Simplicius made a copy of the Enchiridion, which was transmitted under the name of the monastic father Nilus during the 5th century, and as a result found in every monastery library.

Nicholas Blancard made translations of Arrian in 1663 and 1668.

The voyage of Nearchus and Periplus of the Erythrean Sea were translated from the Greek by the then Dean of Westminster, William Vincent, and published in 1809. Vincent published a commentary in 1797 on The voyage of Nearchus. The work was also translated into French by M. Billecocq, under the auspices of the government (cf. p. 321).
