= Gesher (archaeological site) =

Archaeological site in Israel

- גשר (Hebrew)
- Location within Near East Location within Israel
- 32.602778°N 35.555556°E
- Type: Tell
- Periods: PPNA, Neolithic
- Cultures: Khiamian
- Location: 12 kilometres (7.5 mi) South of the Sea of Galilee
- Region: Jordan Valley
- Part of: Village

History
- Built: c. 8000 BC
- Abandoned: c. 8000 BC

Site notes
- Material: Lake bed
- Area: 18 square metres (190 ft^{2}) (excavated by Garfinkel)
- Excavation dates: 1986-1987; 2002-2004
- Archaeologists: Yosef Garfinkel; Susan Cohen
- Condition: Ruins
- Public access: Yes

Gesher is an archaeological site located on the southern bank of Nahal Tavor, near kibbutz Gesher in the central Jordan Valley of Israel. It bears signs of occupation from two periods, the very early Neolithic and the Middle Bronze Age. The site was first excavated between 1986 and 1987 by Yosef Garfinkel of the Hebrew University of Jerusalem and between 2002 and 2004 by Susan Cohen of Montana State University. The average of 4 radiocarbon dating results suggested inhabitation of the settlement around 8000 BC.

== History ==
=== Pre-Pottery Neolithic A ===
During the Pre-Pottery Neolithic A the site was a small village composed of a few rounded structures. Typical flint finds included a high number of el-Khiam points which Garfinkel argued, along with the relatively early date could class Gesher as a Khiamian site. One outstanding discovery, unknown from any other Neolithic site of the period in the Near East, is a workshop for the production of basalt artifacts. The workshop produced basalt axes and various other tools which were then sent to other early Neolithic centers, such as Jericho and Netiv Hagdud. According to radiometric dates, Gesher is one of the earliest Neolithic sites in the Near East. During this period the first villages were established and the transition to agriculture occurred. A final excavation report on the Neolithic site was published in 2006.

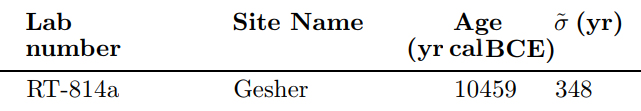
Calibrated Carbon 14 dates for Gesher as of 2013.

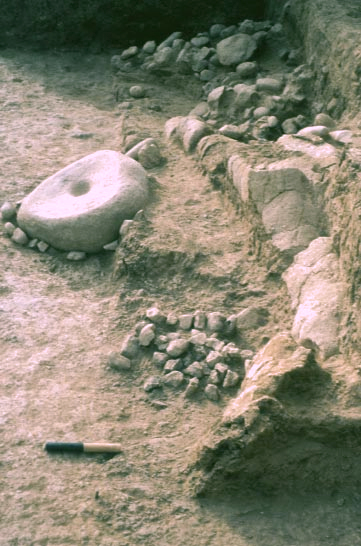
Gesher Pre-Pottery Neolithic A rounded building.

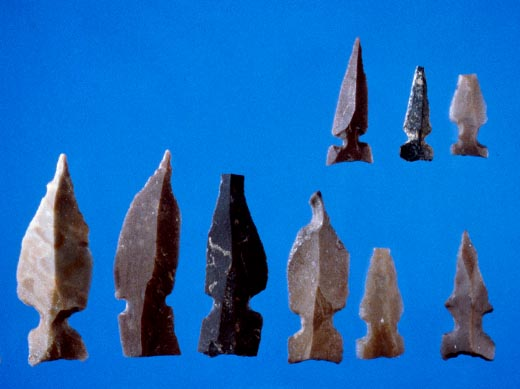
Gesher Pre-Pottery Neolithic A flint arrowheads.

=== Middle Bronze IIA ===
During the Middle Bronze Age IIA, Gesher served as a cemetery. Around 20 graves have been uncovered. These are shaft graves, dug into the local sediment, used for individual burials and never reopened. This facilitates the study of burial customs, including body position, the quantity of grave goods, and their relation to the deceased person. Bronze spearheads and axes (including three duck-bill axes) were found in four of the graves. A final excavation report on the Middle Bronze cemetery was published in 2007.

== Bibliography ==
- Cohen, Susan L. (2004-05-12). "Gesher 2003" (116). Hadashot Arkheologiyot – Excavations and Surveys in Israel.
- Cohen, Susan L. (2005-03-24). "Gesher 2004" (117). Hadashot Arkheologiyot – Excavations and Surveys in Israel.
- Y. Garfinkel and D. Dag. 2006. Gesher: A Pre-Pottery Neolithic A Site in the Central Jordan Valley, Israel. A Final Report. Berlin: Ex Oriente.
- Y. Garfinkel and S. Cohen. 2007. The Early Middle Bronze Cemetery of Gesher. Final Excavation Report. AASOR 62. Boston: American Schools of Oriental Research.
