= Origins of agriculture in West Asia =

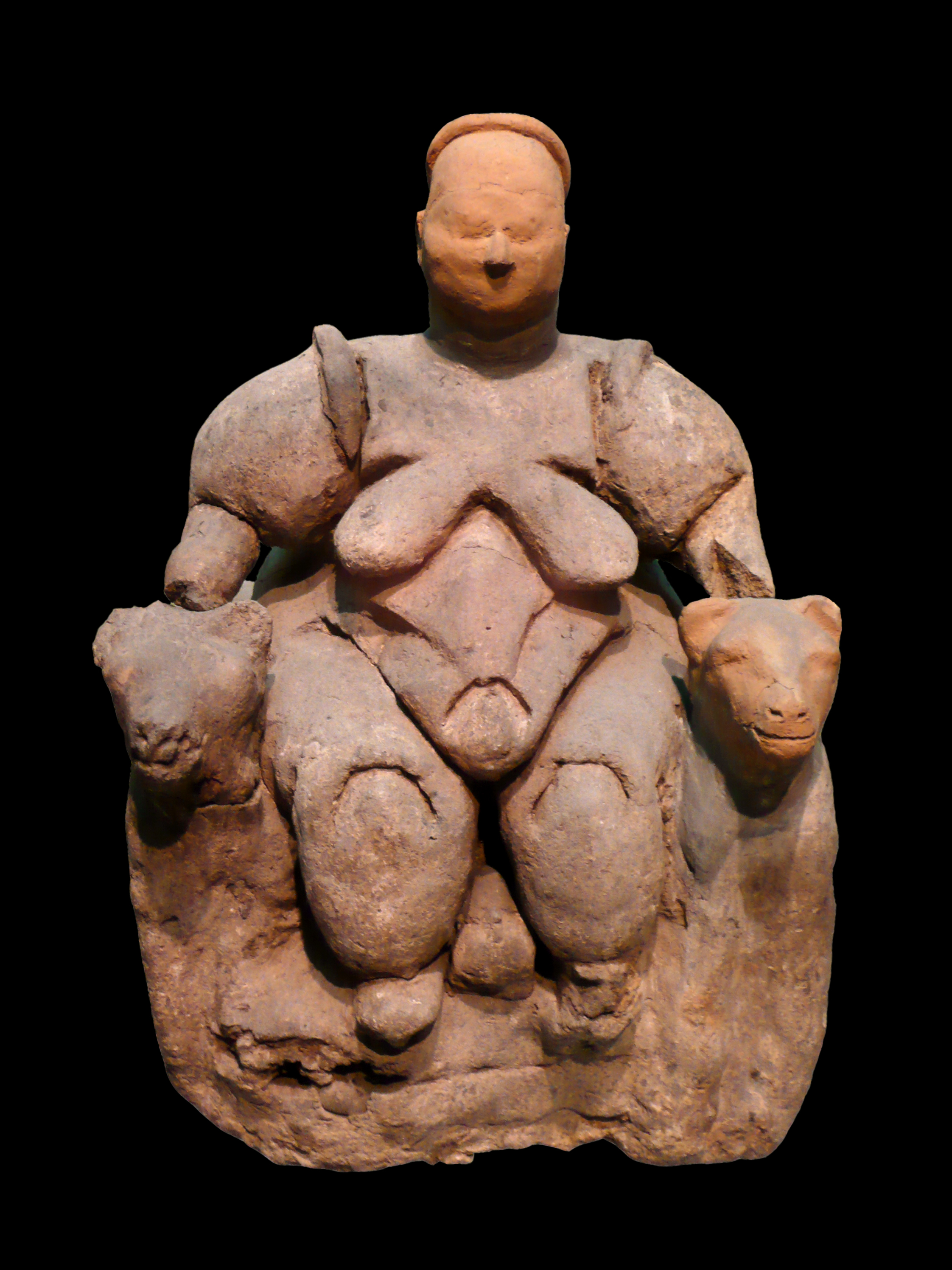
Woman with felines from Çatal Höyük, according to some interpretations an image of humanity's domination over nature that developed in the Neolithic period. 6000–5500 BC. - Museum of Anatolian Civilization, Ankara, Turkey.

Agriculture in West Asia can be traced back to the early Neolithic in the Near East, between 10,000 and 8,000 BC, when a series of domestications by human communities took place, primarily involving a few plants (cereals and legumes) and animals (sheep, goats, bos, and pigs). In these regions, this gradually led to the introduction of agriculture and animal husbandry and their expansion to other parts of the world. The Neolithic is commonly defined as the transition from a "predatory" economy of hunter-gatherers (or "collectors") to a "productive" economy of farmer-breeders, which places the question of plant and animal domestication at the heart of the upheavals brought about by this period.

Farming and livestock breeding appeared in areas of rich biological diversity, where domesticated plants and animals were found in the wild. These regions also contain a large number of food resources in their natural state. Before their domestication, domesticated plants and animals were exploited in the form of gathering and hunting, with the methods and techniques required for domestication already known at the end of the Palaeolithic. Between 9500 and 8500 B.C., "pre-domestic" forms of agriculture were introduced; plants still had a wild character, but their reproduction was controlled by humans. Control of wild animals also began in the same period. These practices gradually led to the emergence of domesticated plant and animal species, which are distinct from the wild forms from which they derive. From a biological point of view, these domesticated species undergo a transition from natural selection to artificial selection by humans. This indicates the conclusion of the domestication process in the period between 8500 BC and 8000 BC. From this point onwards, village communities relied more on the "agro-pastoral" system, combining agriculture and animal husbandry, and less on hunting, fishing, and gathering practices.

Many explanations have been put forward to explain why these changes have occurred, none of which has achieved consensus. The sedentary (or semi-sedentary) lifestyle introduced as early as the Final Epipalaeolithic (c. 12500 BC – 10000 BC) precedes the phenomenon and can therefore no longer be seen as its consequence, but may be one of its causes. Questions have focused on demographic changes since the increase in population prompted human communities to better control their food resources and domesticate. Climatic changes occur during the transition phase between the end of the last Ice Age and the beginning of the Holocene, which coincides with the domestication process and is therefore one of the factors to be taken into account. Other research has emphasized the "symbolic" aspects of the phenomenon, which alters man's relationship with nature.

The development of agriculture is a fundamental process in human history. It led to strong demographic growth and was accompanied by numerous material (notably the appearance of ceramics) and mental changes. Although the Near East was not the only focus of domestication worldwide, it was probably the earliest and most influential. The expansion of agriculture, and with it the Neolithic village lifestyle, was rapid after 8000 B.C., spreading throughout the West and Central Asia, the Indian subcontinent, North and East Africa, and Europe. The species domesticated during this period formed the basis of the economies of these regions until the modern era, and gained even more territory.

== Definitions ==
According to G. Willcox, plant cultivation consists of "assisting the reproduction and hence multiplication of plants" and their domestication is defined as "selection of cultivar traits, for example the loss of the dispersal mechanism". A domesticated plant is therefore different from the wild plant from which it derives (its "progenitor"), as can be seen from their morphology, which is not identical. The cultivation of plants and the acquisition of domesticated traits did not occur at the same time, since the latter is the consequence of the former:

1. a first phase of "pre-domestic" plant cultivation, in which species still have a wild morphology, as the selection process has not yet succeeded in bringing about morphological changes (i.e. cultivation without and before domestication);
2. the "domestic" cultivation of plants, which derives from the former, when the process of selection and domestication has been completed and the morphology of the plants is no longer wild but domestic (i.e. cultivation with and after domestication).

According to D. Helmer, the domestication of animals can be defined as "the control of an animal population through the isolation of the herd, with the loss of panmixia, the suppression of natural selection and the application of artificial selection based on particular traits, either behavioral or cultural. The animals become the property of the human group, and are entirely dependent on it".

The criteria for defining domestication vary according to whether plants or animals are considered: for botanists, a plant is domesticated when it has a domestic morphology, while for zoologists, an animal is domesticated when it is integrated into and manipulated by a human group.

Agriculture, which is the result of these evolutions, can be defined as "an established production economy in which farmers depend for their subsistence on cultivation and, in many instances, herding".

== History of studies ==
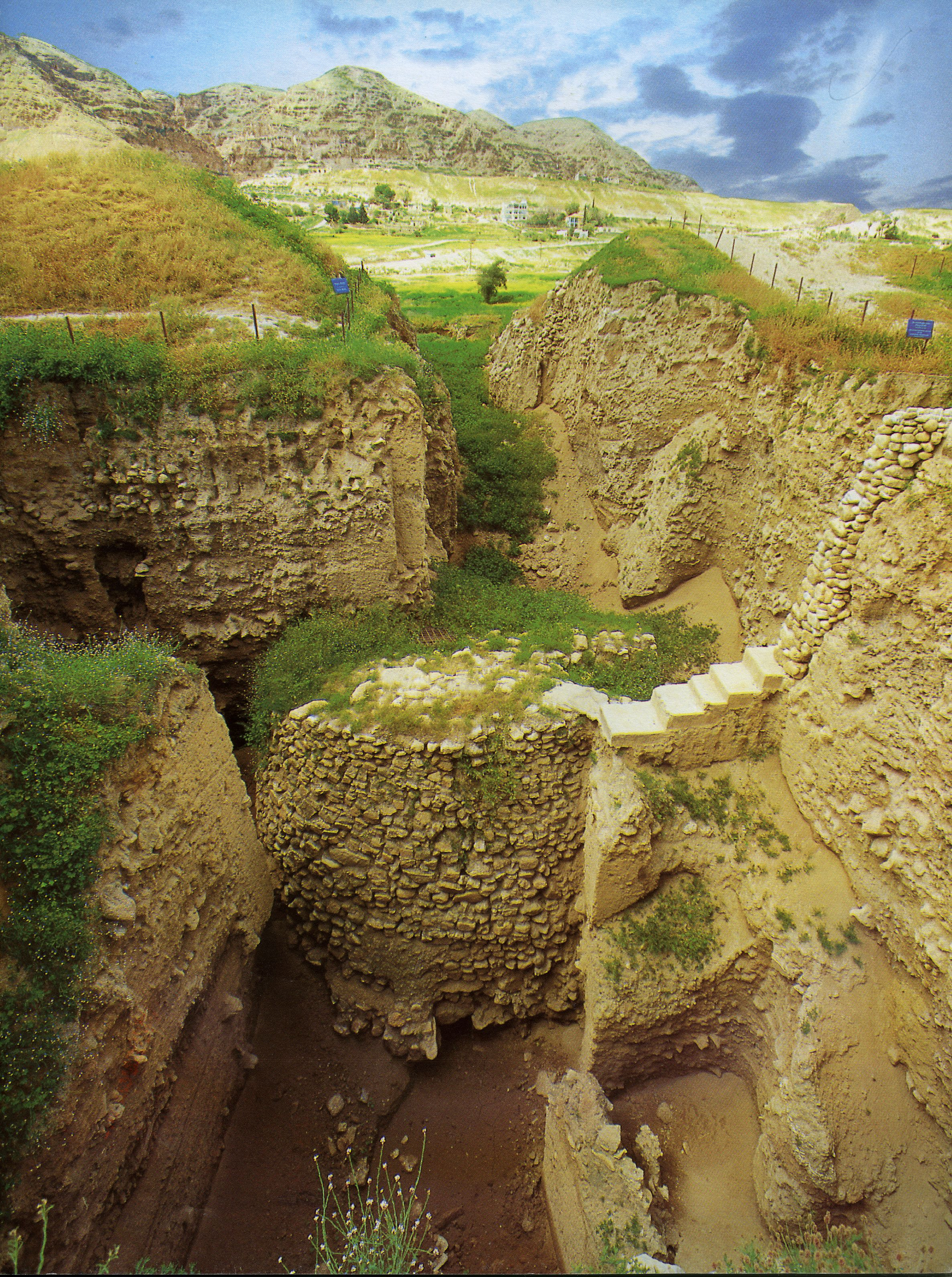
Ruins of the Tell es-Sultan site, Jericho.

Little was known about the beginnings of agriculture in the Near Eastern Neolithic before the 1950s, when three major excavations identified and dated sites such as Jericho (Tell es-Sultan in the West Bank), excavated by Kathleen Kenyon, Beidha (Jordan), excavated by Diana Kirkbride, and Jarmo (northern Iraq), excavated by Robert John Braidwood. From the 1960s–70s, excavations of Neolithic sites began to expand in the Middle East (particularly following rescue excavations in anticipation of the construction of the Tabqa dam in Syria). These excavations improved knowledge of the period and provided more data on agriculture. Conservation of the samples is facilitated by the region's arid climate. After 1995, excavations multiplied and provided a considerable amount of data.

The biological approach to domestication can be traced back to the work of Charles Darwin, notably The Variation of Animals and Plants Under Domestication (1868). Archaeobotanical studies took off in the 1960s, particularly following the work of Maria Hopf and Hans Helbæk, and later Willem van Zeist, Gordon Hillman, Jack Harlan, and Daniel Zohary. This work led to the development of methods for identifying and analyzing samples and to a better understanding of the process of plant domestication from a biological point of view. Many archaeozoological studies have also developed and refined knowledge of animal domestication. The contribution of genetics in particular is helping to advance understanding of the phenomenon. In just a few decades, archaeologists have been joined by other specialists in the study of this phenomenon: botanists, zoologists, geneticists, chemists, demographers, and linguists.

From an economic, social and cultural point of view, the study of the phenomenon was marked by the work of Vere Gordon Childe, who in the 1920s and 1930s introduced his concept of the "Neolithic revolution", which characterized the beginning of agriculture. From the 1950s onwards, interpretations developed along different lines: the ecological model of David L. Clarke's ecological model (1953), Lewis Binford's demographic model (1969), Kent Flannery's broad-spectrum revolution (1969), followed in the post-1990s by Ofer Bar-Yosef's climatic approach, and Jacques Cauvin's "symbolic revolution".

== Geography ==
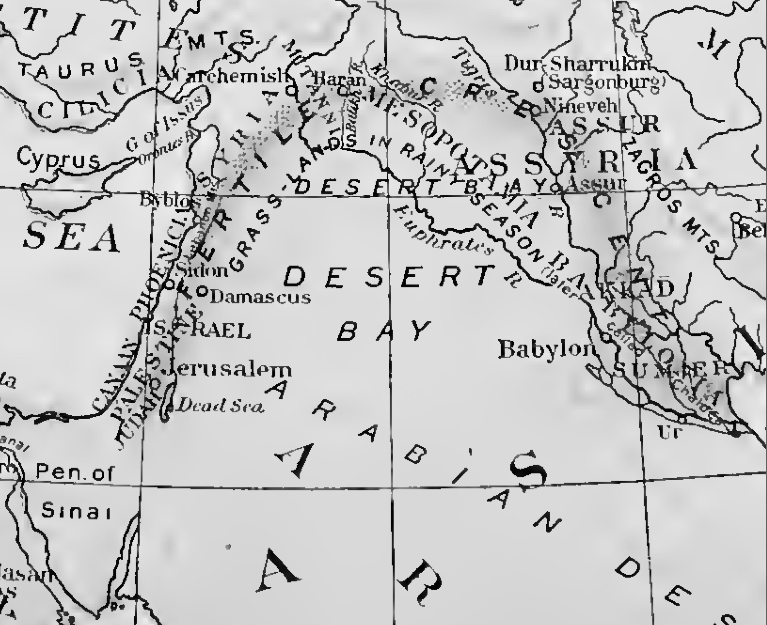
Map of the Fertile Crescent by James Henry Breasted, 1916.

Location of the main Neolithic geographical areas in the Near East.

In Neolithic studies, the Near East is understood as a region stretching from the Mediterranean Sea to the Zagros, from the Red Sea and the Persian Gulf to the Taurus Mountains, to which Cyprus and Central Anatolia are commonly included, because they participated rapidly in the Neolithization process. This vast region encompasses a great diversity of natural environments and landscapes, grouped into several major zones according to geographical and cultural criteria.

The environments are diverse not only on the scale of this part of the world but also over short distances: it sometimes takes just a few kilometers to go from the Mediterranean forest to the steppe. The contrasts are further accentuated by the presence of highlands and wide seasonal and annual variations in precipitation. The result is great biodiversity, in particular, the presence of hundreds of plant species. Domesticated varieties are all found in their natural state, but more generally, wild cereals are found from central Anatolia to the southern Levant and central Zagros. Genetic studies have made it possible in some cases to determine the plant and animal variants that gave rise to the domesticated species, but this remains uncertain in several cases. This has been referred to as the "Fertile Crescent", a concept that originated in the work of James Henry Breasted, and which in its current sense is a biogeographical area that extends roughly over the Levant and the slopes and foothills of the Taurus and Zagros.

=== Levant ===
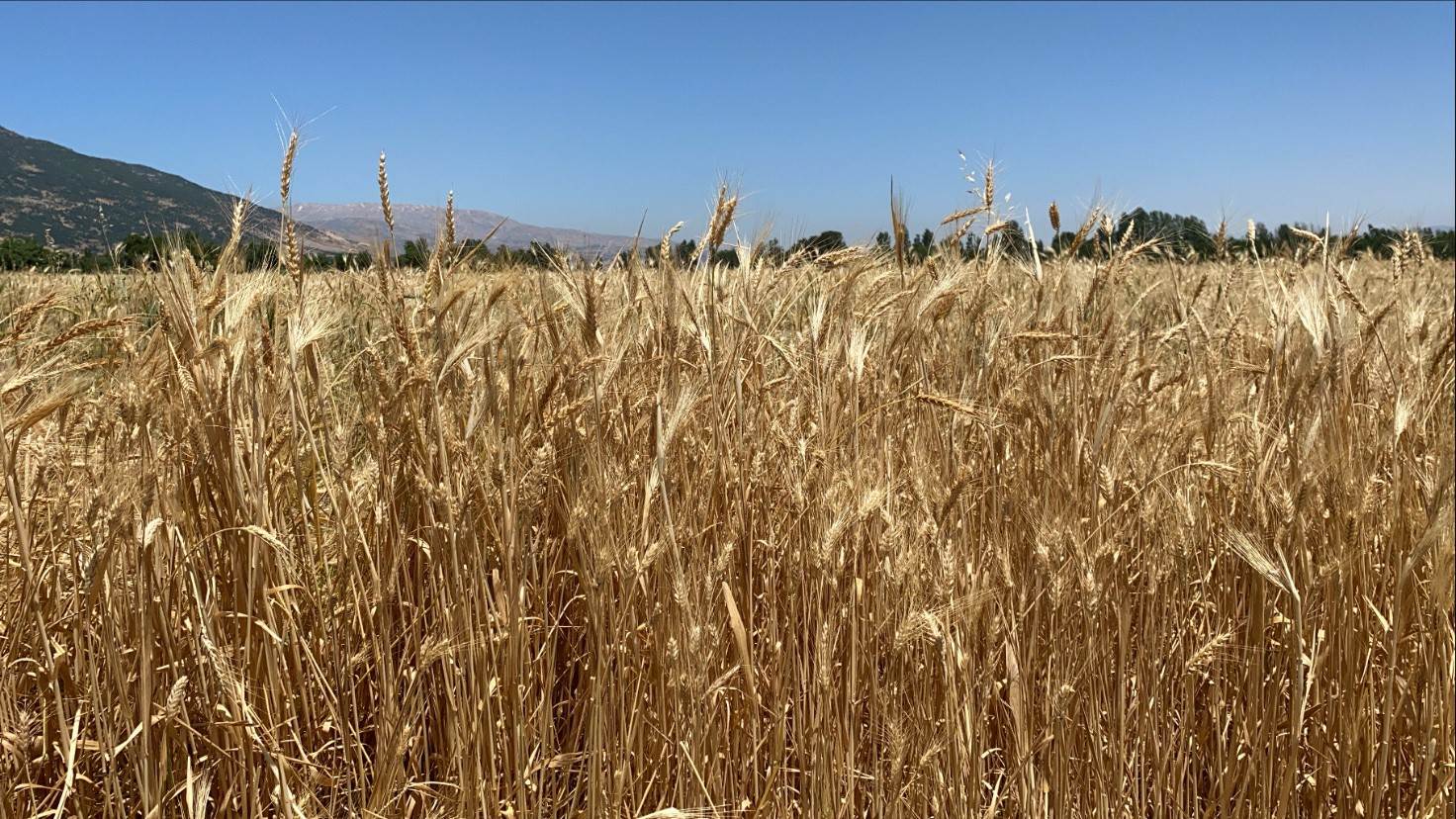
Wheat field in the Bekaa Plain (2021).

The Levant, located to the east of the eastern Mediterranean, is characterized by alternating environments stretching in a north-south direction: the coastal plain to the west, which was wider during the Epipaleolithic and Neolithic periods than it is today, since sea levels were lower, then progressing eastwards, the foothills gradually rise to form mountain ranges, often well-forested and reaching up to 2,000 meters in altitude, then a new low-lying zone, the Rift or "Levantine corridor", a structuring axis that descends to the south below sea level, followed by an area of higher plateaus and, finally, a slow descent towards the Arabian desert. This region is divided into three geographical areas, sometimes two, with the same west-east division.

- The southern Levant, north of Sinai and the Negev, comprising the coastal plain, the Upper Galilee and Judean mountains, the Jordan plain with the Dead Sea and Lake Tiberias, the Arabah plain to the south, and the Transjordanian plateaus to the east.
- The central Levant (sometimes attached to the Northern Levant, of which it is then the "upper" part, other times partly grouped with the Southern Levant), between the Damascus oasis (included) to the south and the Homs gap to the north, with the coastal plain of Lebanon, the Lebanon Mountains, the Litani Valley and the Beqaa Plain, then the Anti-Lebanon Mountains, whose eastern slopes shelter the Ghouta around Damascus and finally the desert.
- The northern Levant comprises the Syrian coastal plain, which is wider here than elsewhere in the Levant, then the Alawite mountains and the Amanus, then the Orontes valley, the Amuq plain, then the Central Syrian plateaus and, bounded to the east by the Euphrates, the Middle Euphrates region, which can be seen as another "corridor".

The north-western edge of the Arabian Desert is a steppe. During the Neolithic period, it included great variations in settlement. In wetter periods, there were a few temporary watercourses, lakes and artesian springs that formed oases (el Kowm, Azraq).

=== Mesopotamia ===
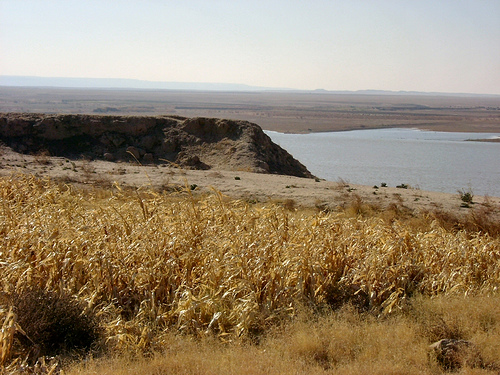
Cereal field near the Euphrates River in northwestern Iraq today.

Mesopotamia in the broadest sense comprises the regions dissected by the Tigris and Euphrates, the two main rivers of the Middle East.

- Southeastern Anatolia is the northernmost part of Upper Mesopotamia, structured by the high valleys of the Tigris and Euphrates rivers. This is a threshold region, with altitudes declining from around 800 to 300 meters from north to south, between the high regions of the Eastern Taurus to the north, where the two rivers originate, and the Jezirah plateaus towards which they flow. The valleys here are narrow, but in places widen into alveoli where human communities nest. To the west lie the Anti-Taurus mountains.
- Jezirah, the "island" that covers most of Upper Mesopotamia, is a region of plateaus averaging 250/300 m in altitude, incised by the Tigris, the Euphrates and two tributaries of the latter, the Belikh and the Khabur, divided into a more watered Upper Jezirah to the north-northeast, and a drier Lower Jezirah to the south-southwest.
- The Mesopotamian alluvial and deltaic plain is a vast region with a currently very arid climate, very flat and very low-lying, where the two rivers join to form a delta, very marshy downstream, before flowing into the Persian Gulf, much further away in the early Neolithic period than today, due to lower sea levels (during the peak of the Late Ice Age, perhaps up to the level of the Gulf of Oman), then higher up in the late Neolithic period, creating an environment that is probably much wetter than today.

=== Taurus-Zagros mountain ranges ===
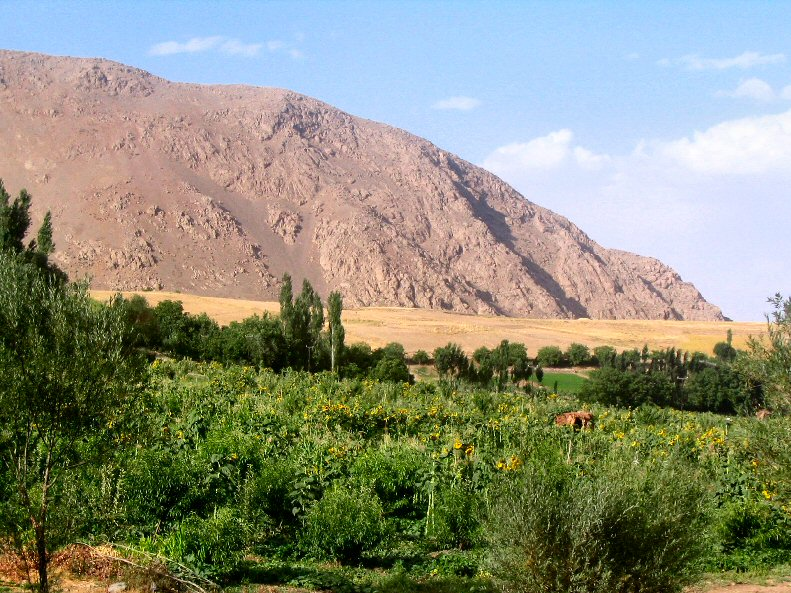
Central Zagros Valley.

At the northern and eastern ends are several high areas, with the presence of the Taurus-Zagros arc mountain ranges, home to elevated regions that are for many if not homes at least regions that actively participated in the success of the Neolithic way of life.

- The Zagros, here mainly concerned with its western and central parts, is a chain of parallel folds running north-west/south-east, incised by numerous depressions formed by rivers flowing towards Mesopotamia (for the most important, from north to south: Great Zab, Little Zab, Diyala, Karkheh, Karun), which form deep valleys, often cramped and isolated from each other, explaining why Neolithic cultures seem to be segmented between them; the south-western slope, more watered, ends in a foothill zone towards Mesopotamia.
- Central Anatolia, separated from the northern Levant by the Taurus Mountains, is a region of high plateaus, over 1,000 meters above sea level, with a more arid eastern part, home to the salt lake Lake Tuz and volcanic cones, and a more wooded western part, with a lake region to the southwest.

=== Cyprus ===
The island of Cyprus is also a geographical component of the Near Eastern Neolithic. The third-largest Mediterranean island, situated 100 kilometers from the coast of the northern Levant, it comprises three east-west groups that follow one another from north to south: along its northern coast, the mountains of the Kyrenia range, the Mesaoria plain and, in the center-west, the Troodos Mountains. The southern coast includes the main prehistoric and ancient settlement areas, notably around the Akrotiri peninsula and the Larnaca plain.

== Climate fluctuations ==
The Near Eastern Neolithic period coincides with the end of the last Ice Age (and with it the Pleistocene) and the beginning of the Holocene. However, this period cannot be summed up simply as a gradual warming, as the climate underwent several fluctuations during the Epipaleolithic and Neolithic phases:

- the Late Glacial maximum, from around 23000/22000 to 17000 BC, is the coldest and driest phase of this era, followed by a phase of slow warming and, above all, increased precipitation, allowing a slow retreat of semi-arid zones;
- the Bölling-Alleröd phase, which began around 12700–12500 B.C. and lasted perhaps until 11000/10800 B.C., was warmer and wetter, leading to an expansion of wooded areas in the southern Levant and grassy and humid areas (notably lakes) in Anatolia;
- the Younger Dryas, which began at the earliest around 11000 BC and ended around 9700 BC (a long estimate goes as far back as 9000), was a cold, dry period; a study carried out for the Southern Levant seems to conclude, however, that the period was no drier than the previous one, even if it was colder;
- the beginning of the Holocene, which saw a softening of the climate, may initially have been dry before a more rapid change around 8200–8000 BC, with some people putting it at around 7500 BC; the climate then became wetter (the summer monsoon moved further north than today) and is the wettest observed over the last 25,000 years in the Levant and eastern Mediterranean, with the Arabian desert receiving on average more precipitation over the period 8000–4000 B.C. than today, as well as the Mesopotamian south, which was probably more marshy;
- this period was disrupted by the climatic event of 8200 B.P. (roughly 6200 B.C.), a cold, arid episode lasting around 160 to 200 years.

These variations in temperature and precipitation had a significant impact on natural environments. These impacts probably affected valleys less than steppe areas. In the latter, human occupation seems to have fluctuated in line with these changes. In the regions of the Levant and Upper Mesopotamia, it is variations in precipitation, especially concentrated in winter and which can be very large from one year to the next under current conditions, have had a greater impact on human societies than fluctuations in temperature. It is generally accepted that 200 mm of annual precipitation are needed for agriculture without artificial water input ("dry"), but in areas at the junction of arid zones, this limit may be exceeded one year and not reached the next. The "Fertile Crescent", where agriculture originated, therefore sees its geographical limits shift, either according to long-term climatic trends or according to variations in rainfall from one year to the next.

== Chronology ==
The transitional phase between Paleolithic and Neolithic lifestyles, which includes the Near Eastern Neolithic, can be divided into three main periods:

- The Final Epipaleolithic period, around 13000–10000/9600 B.C., saw the start of sedentarization in the Levant during the Early Natufian (c. 13000/12500–11600/11000 B.C.), with the appearance of the first permanent villages (Mallaha, Hayonim) and a general decline in group mobility, even if most Middle Eastern settlements remained seasonal. Subsistence was based on hunting and gathering, and there was no assured domestication of plants and animals. During the Late Natufian (c. 11600/11000–11000/9600 BC), the climate cooled (Younger Dryas), which seems to have led to a decline in sedentary life in the southern Levant, whereas in the Middle Euphrates region, sedentary sites developed (Tell Abu Hureyra, Mureybet).
- The Pre-Ceramic or Aceamic Neolithic periods, around 10000–7000/6400 B.C. They are divided into two phases known as Pre-Pottery Neolithic A (PPNA for short), from around 10200/10000-9000/8000 B.C. and B (Pre-Pottery Neolithic B, abbreviated to PPNB), from around 9000/8800 to 7000 B.C. (but up to 640 B.C. in the southern Levant). These saw the beginnings of agriculture and animal husbandry, the expansion and consolidation of village settlements and the emergence of communal architecture, but no pottery. These are the phases during which the "Neolithic revolution" takes place in the Near East.
- The phases of the Ceramic or Late Neolithic (c. 7000/6400–5300/4500 BC) saw the expansion of village dwellings, the appearance of pottery craftsmanship, the development of agriculture with the perfecting of irrigation and its expansion into new regions. They end with the first developments in copper metallurgy, marking the beginning of the Chalcolithic period. Societies were not very unequal.

Chronology of the Neolithic in the Levant, according to various dates (proposals by K. Wright based on other work)
	B.C. Cal.	B.P. Cal.	Subsistence
Early Natufian	12780–1118	14720–13130	Broad-spectrum collection and selective hunting.
Recent Natufian	11180–10040	13130–11990	Collection of cereals, small seeds and animals, climatic deterioration.
Pre-Pottery Neolithic A	10040–8940	11990–10890	Broad-spectrum collection with development of pre-domestic agriculture and animal control, climatic improvement.
Early Pre-Pottery Neolithic B	8940–8460	10890–10410	Early stages of plant and animal domestication, coupled with broad-spectrum collection.
Middle Pre-Pottery Neolithic B	8460–7560	10410–9510	Consolidation and spread of agriculture and animal husbandry ("agro-pastoralism"), development of pastoral nomadism.
Recent Pre-Pottery Neolithic B	7560–6940	8510–8890	Consolidation and spread of agriculture and animal husbandry ("agro-pastoralism"), development of pastoral nomadism.
Late Pre-Pottery Neolithic B	6940–6400	8890–8350	Consolidation and spread of agriculture and animal husbandry ("agro-pastoralism"), development of pastoral nomadism.
Late Neolithic	6400–5480	8350–7430	"Agro-pastoral" communities throughout the Near East, spreading to neighboring regions.

Location of Natufian and associated sites (c. 12500–10000 BC).

Location of major Pre-Ceramic Neolithic A sites (c. 10000–9000 BC).

Location of main Pre-Ceramic Neolithic B sites (c. 9000–6400 BC).

Location of main Late Neolithic sites (c. 6400–5300 BC).

== Evidence for domestication ==
The study of domestication requires the ability to distinguish in archaeological data whether a species whose remains have been found was acquired by man through hunting or gathering, or agriculture or animal husbandry. The generally accepted indisputable proof that a species is domesticated, whether animal or plant, is a specific morphology that distinguishes it from the wild species from which it derives. But change only occurs when the domestication process is complete, not while it is underway. Specialists have distinguished a preliminary and necessary phase, known as "pre-domestication", during which species are cultivated or bred, while still having a wild morphology. This means that criteria must be put in place to identify this phase.

=== The plants ===
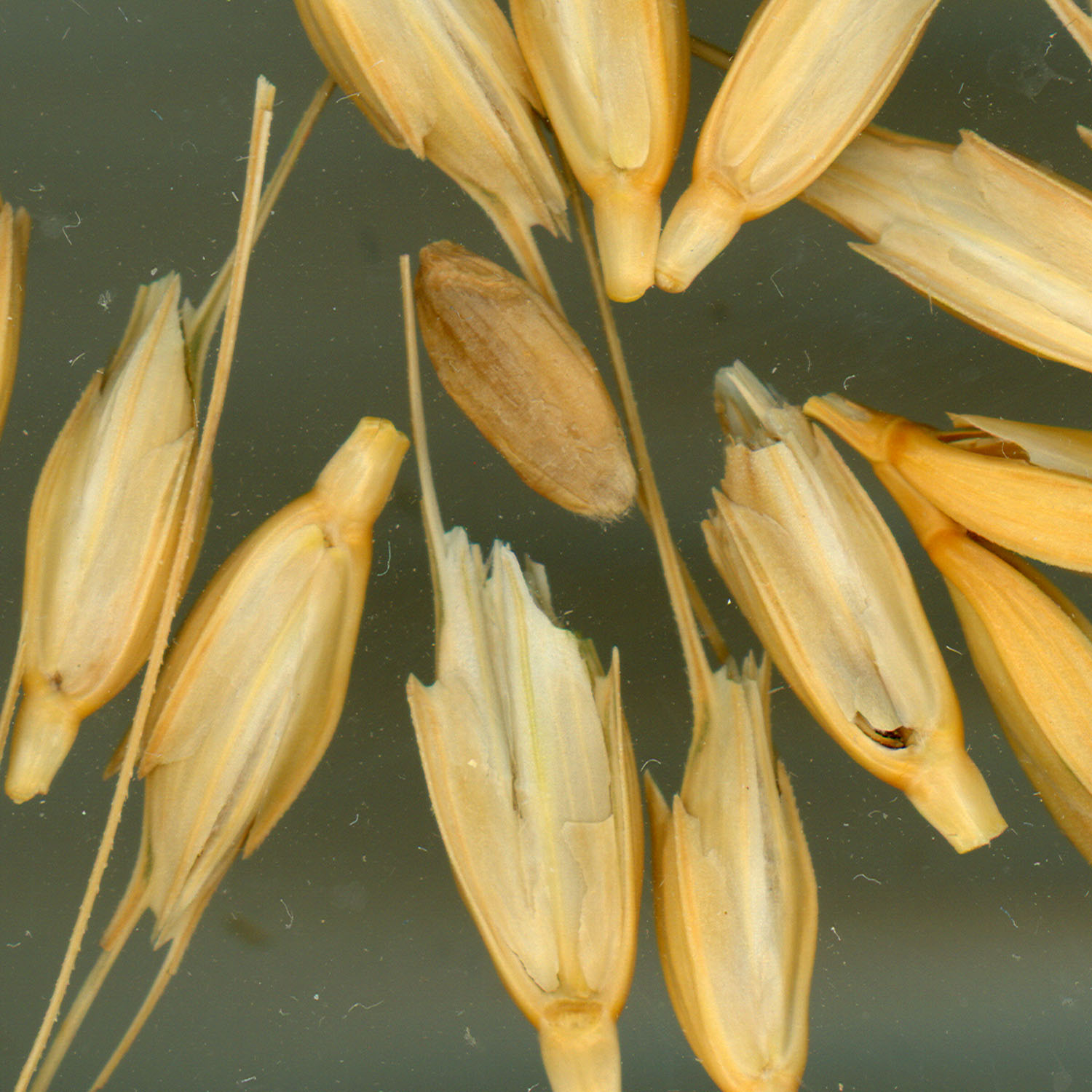
Einkorn spikelets (Triticum monococcum).

The indisputable proof of plant domestication is morphological: after a certain period, plants undergo a physical evolution that enables them to be identified in archaeological documentation as "domestic" variants. Criteria vary from species to species. In the case of wild cereals, the grain-bearing spikelets at the end of the ear detach easily from it, spread over the ground, and sow it naturally (ginning). For humans, this reduces the yield of these cereals, but they reproduce without the need for sowing. In the domesticated state, the spikelets remain fused to the ear: this is the loss of the dispersal mechanism. These spikelets only detach after human threshing, which allows a greater number of grains to be harvested, but requires sowing to grow new ones. In the context of natural selection, these properties are found in the wild in a small minority of mutant varieties. The proportion of these varieties has subsequently been increased by a long process of artificial selection - whether conscious or unconscious - by man, giving rise to domestic cereals. The other morphological disadvantage that wild cereals have for man is that their grains are enclosed in a husk that has to be removed by shelling and threshing. Domestic varieties, on the other hand, are "naked" and do not require this step. Unlike cereals, wild legumes naturally emerge from their pods (dehiscence), again to facilitate multiplication, whereas in the domesticated state, they must be dehulled. The increased size of domesticated seeds compared with wild ones is another distinguishing feature, but this takes longer to develop and is generally considered less convincing.

These elements are evidence of successful domestication. However, they come at the end of the process, which has been made up of many failed and successful attempts, with many repetitions. It's hard to say how long it took. In the past, it may have been considered a matter of a century or two, but today it is assumed that it took a period of at least the order of a millennium for morphologically domesticated varieties to become established. Perhaps more, since the loss of the dispersal mechanism could have taken 2,000 to 4,000 years to settle on domestic barley and wheat. This may be because that early farmers long preferred to use wild cereals to sow their fields, rather than drawing on their stock of cereals with a "mutant" preponderance, before the latter became dominant. The first farmers undoubtedly favoured variety and probably began by unconsciously selecting before they were able to identify the advantages and disadvantages of the cereal varieties they could select. The fact that they cultivated in different ways could also explain why biological domestication takes so long to be observed. The question of whether domesticated plants developed during this process are more nutritious than wild plants has been the subject of several experimental studies. The first concluded that harvesting wild variants was more profitable, but a later study concluded that domesticated varieties have higher yields and larger grains than wild variants, probably due to selection by farmers.

To identify the first experiments in plant domestication while they were still underway, we can't rely on morphological criteria alone. These domestication experiments are taking place even though the plants still have a wild morphology, even though they have already been manipulated by human groups: these are "pre-domestic" cereals. These are morphologically wild but multiplied by human action. Archaeologists then turn to another method, known as the "cluster of clues" method: identifying clues to domestication which, taken in isolation, are not evidence, but which, accumulated in the same place and at the same time, leave less room for doubt. G. Willcox has thus identified several criteria for identifying this "pre-domestic" agriculture: an increase in the consumption of cereals and legumes (the "founding" domestic plants) compared with plants grown strictly by gathering; the spread of varieties, which appear on a site where they were previously absent, no doubt due to human action; the presence of "weeds" (adventitious plants), characteristic of cultivated fields; the increase in grain size, one of the morphological consequences of domestication as seen above; the large-scale storage of grain; the presence of house mice, attracted by these same stocks (commensalism); the use of grain husks in construction; the presence of numerous sickle blades used for harvesting; complex grain milling facilities.

=== The animals ===
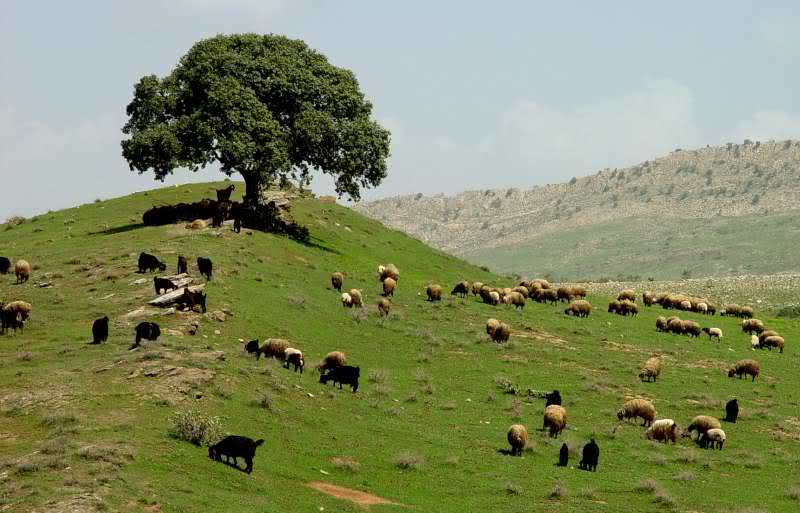
Sheep farming in northern Iraq.

When it comes to animals, there is no decisive criterion: researchers generally base their decisions on morphology. For example, domesticated species tend to be smaller than wild ones. This evolution could be linked to the disappearance of natural selection and, more generally, to the end of the wild lifestyle. A poorer diet for domesticated animals, or the selection made by humans who prefer to control smaller animals, could lead to a loss of robustness in livestock. To identify this change, we need a large sample of animal remains to measure their size and determine whether or not they are wild species. In ruminants, horn shape and size are also evolving in relation to wild variants. We also observe the sex and age of slaughtered animals, determined by the bones, provided they are sufficiently complete: a domestic herd will tend to have more adult females than males (sex-ratio analysis), to have more female breeders, whereas in the wild the proportions are equivalent; if we rely on modern practices, a farm intended to produce meat will tend to slaughter above all young adult males, which are not normally the individuals with the highest mortality in the wild and whose high mortality is likely to jeopardize the renewal of the herd.

Other criteria used by zoologists are: the presence of a species outside its usual habitat zone, indicating that it has potentially been displaced by human action; breeding-related pathologies (deformations of animal bones); variations in animal diet (through the study of stable isotopes); fossil DNA.

Here again, it is more difficult to identify changes at the time of domestication, i.e. the remains of animals that D. Helmer proposes to designate as "agriomorphs", morphologically wild but already domesticated or at least tamed by a human community, as few criteria will be identifiable. It has also been spoken of "proto-husbandry", but the terminology is debated. In any case, the domestication process for animals was probably shorter than that for plants: from a few years to two centuries.

== The first domestications of plants and animals ==
The first plants cultivated in the Near East, known as the "founders", consisted of a group of at least nine plants: cereals, barley, awned wheat and einkorn; legumes, lentils, broad beans, ervils, peas and chickpeas; and flax; this list could be extended to include other plants (rye, oats, durum wheat, grass pea, vetches, etc.). The first cultivators probably grew other plants, or at least managed their reproduction, and it was only later that founder plants took on major importance.

After the dog, the first domesticated animals were the four primary domesticated ungulates: sheep, goats, pigs and cows. The domestic cat is also attested during the Neolithic.

These concomitant developments occurred for the first time in human history in the Middle East, although it is not the only place in the world to have experimented with domestication independently.

=== Subsistence among the last hunter-gatherers ===
The preludes to plant and animal domestication occur during the final period of the Upper Paleolithic: the Epipaleolithic, at the end of which (c. 12500–11000 BC) human groups are hunter-gatherers who begin to settle. Even if there is no solid evidence that they practiced pre-domestic agriculture, we can assume from ethnographic examples that they were at least familiar with methods to promote plant multiplication, which facilitated experimentation in several regions.

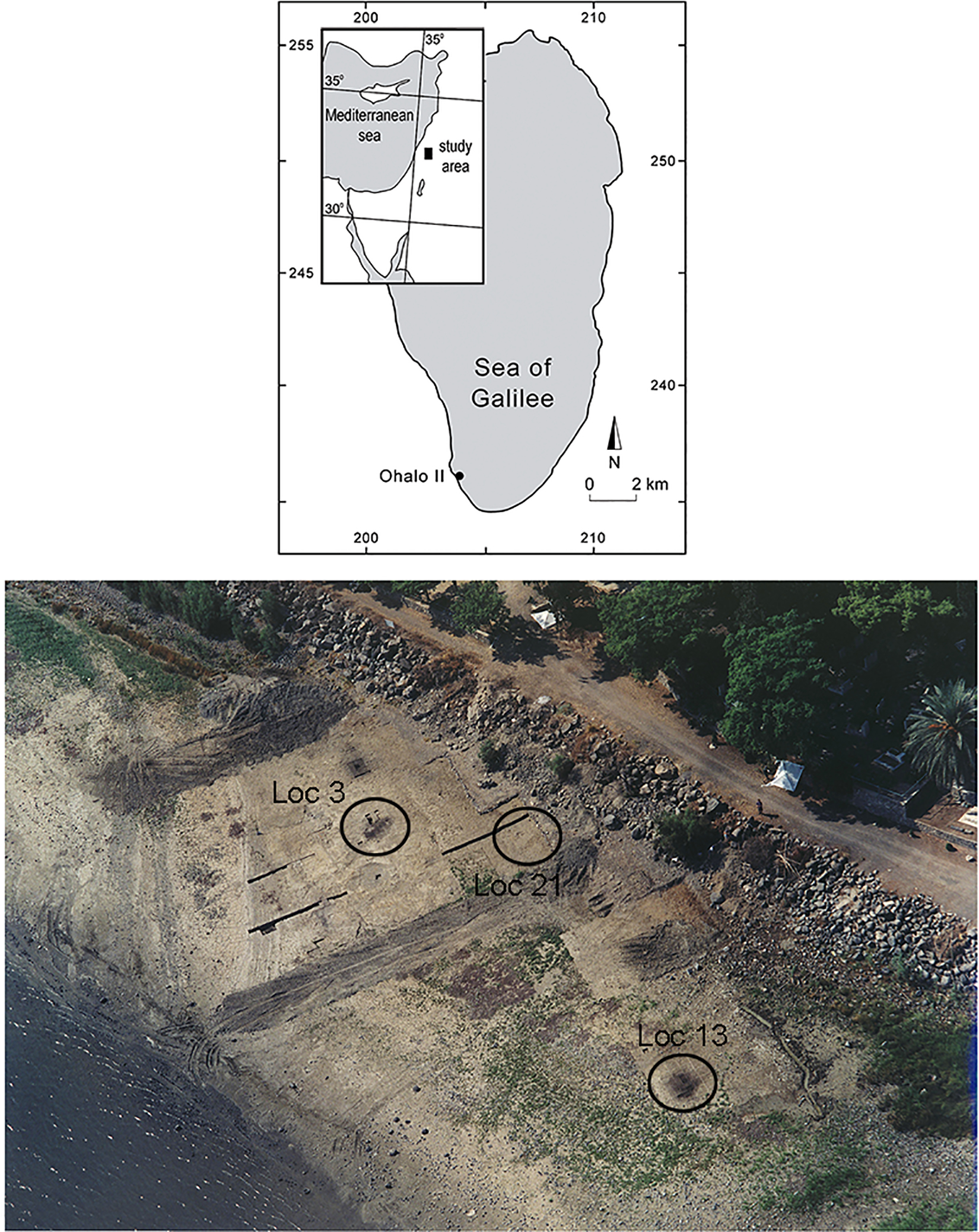
Location and aerial view of the Ohalo II site (Israel).

For the Early Epipaleolithic, the Ohalo II site, circa 21,000 BC, is the only one to provide data. It attests to the gathering of cereals, and a very large number of plant species (wheat and barley, legumes, pistachios, figs, etc.), small and large game (especially gazelle) and fish caught in the lake are also observed. It was therefore a "broad-spectrum" subsistence. There may also have been attempts to grow wild cereals during this period.

There is virtually no data on subsistence until around 12500 BC, and little on settlement, but it seems that over the long term, occupation of the territory intensified. The ecological zoning of the Levant offered a wide variety of resources, depending on latitude, altitude and proximity to water sources. Thus, for animals, big game varied according to whether the group was located near high wooded areas (fallow deer, roe deer, wild goat, wild boar, also gazelle), high plateaus (mountain gazelle, wild boar, wild goat, hemione), semi-arid areas (wild goat and sheep), while small game (fox, hare, tortoise) could be found on almost all sites. For these bands exploiting the resources located within 10-15 kilometers of their non-permanent camp, optimal use of the various ecological spaces, for both plants and animals, is a determining factor.

The situation is broadly similar for hunter-gatherers of the Early Natufian and Zarzian periods (c. 12500–11000 BC), with the difference that they seem to have benefited from better climatic conditions before the younger Dryas. They consumed the same types of plants and animals: cereals and other grasses, legumes, pistachios; large game for the most part (gazelle dominant in the Levant, fallow deer, wild boar, auroch, hemione, etc.) and also small game (hares, foxes, tortoises, birds); and fishing where possible.

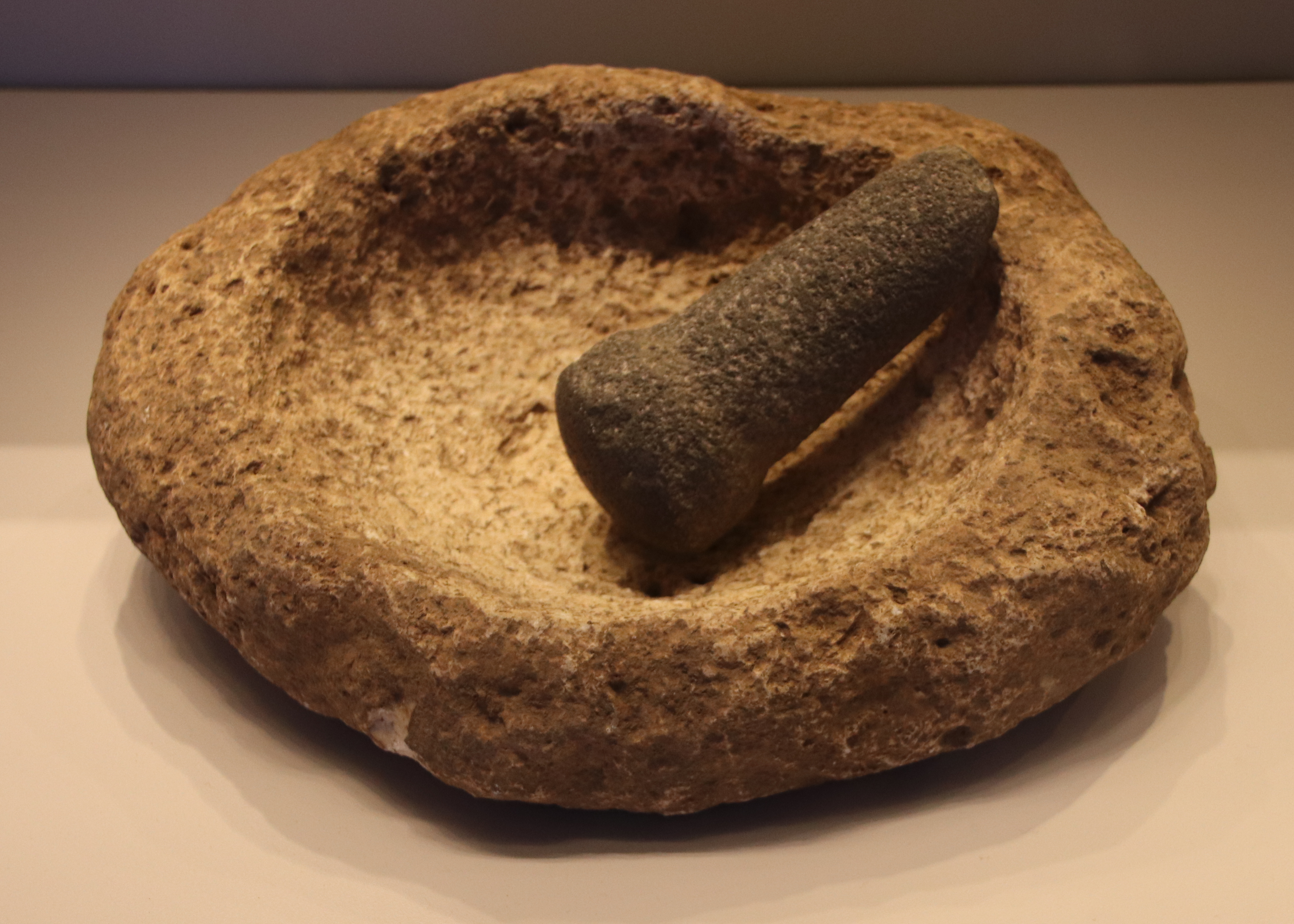
Basalt mortar and limestone pestle from Nahal Oren, Early Natufian. Israel Museum.

In terms of plants, the Natufian period (classically seen as the time of the appearance of sedentary groups) saw the development of structures for storing foodstuffs, and the elaboration of more efficient grinding tools, which no doubt led to the grinding of flour and the baking of bread. These communities may also have consumed fermented beverages, an ancestor of beer. In any case, the role of cereals in their subsistence is relatively increasing, indicating an evolution towards selective gathering. There are some indications that forms of "proto-agriculture" may have been practiced at this time (notably rye at Tell Abu Hureyra), but these are not decisive. Despite the changes, the future "founder" cereals at this stage represent only around 10% of the botanical remains found at Natufian sites. Thus, their place in subsistence, which is of the "broad spectrum" type, is still far from essential alongside other gathered plants (cyperaceae, small-seeded herbs, vegetables, fruits, including many nuts).

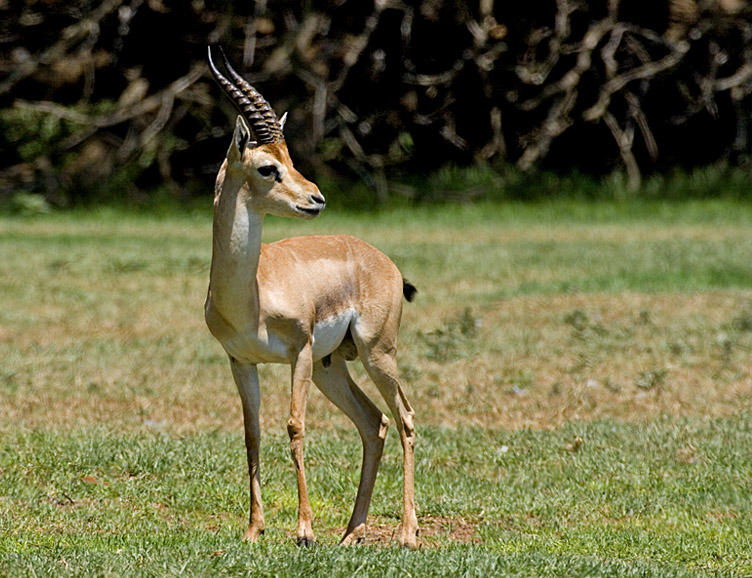
The mountain gazelle (Gazella gazella), is the animal most hunted by Natufian communities in the Levant, which may have been the subject of unsuccessful attempts at domestication.

The picture is similar for animals: the Natufians certainly hunt a lot of game, but they have a strong predilection for the gazelle. It has been suggested that this was an attempt to domesticate this animal, but it is more reasonable to postulate selective hunting that did not lead to domestication. The Natufian period can therefore be seen as a phase of experimentation, at the end of which humans can determine which animal and plant species are most suitable for domestication. In the case of the gazelle, this proved inconclusive, unlike cereals, goats, sheep, and other species, which were also more intensively collected.

The domesticated dog seems to have been attested for the Natufian period, by its presence in two tombs alongside humans, which is seen as an indication of an affective bond involving a relationship between master and animal. However, it was domesticated earlier and elsewhere. Dogs act as human auxiliaries, which makes them useful to humans. They are (along with cats and even mice) a special case in the domestication process since it is thought that they have undoubtedly associated themselves with human communities, consuming the same products (they are said to be "commensals"). They are therefore undoubtedly actors in their domestication.

=== The "pre-domestic" phases ===
Location of identified foci of cereal domestication in the Near East: pre-domestic agriculture (italics) and morphological domestication (right). Ohalo II is a hypothetical early-stage developer.

The domestication of plants and animals took shape during the PPNA and early PPNB (c. 9500–8500 BC). These phases correspond to the beginning of the Holocene, which saw the end of the cooling phase of the Younger Dryas and the establishment of a climate that was undoubtedly more conducive to the perpetuation of agricultural practices. These are the periods for which several archaeological sites bear witness to the development of "pre-domestic" agriculture.

In the reconstructions proposed by researchers, they consider that selective and more intensive gathering of cereals and legumes may have led to the first attempts to control their reproduction to secure or increase food resources. This would take the form of extensive "pre-domestic" cultivation, based on several scattered plots of land that do not require extensive maintenance and are not cultivated every year, as is the case in hunter-gatherer communities studied by ethnologists in contemporary times. This means that humans are beginning to manipulate and modify the natural environment, a process that is becoming more and more pronounced as experimentation progresses. Cereals tend to be harvested early, before the grains of the wild variants that are still dominant are dispersed. This phenomenon is "opportunistic, flexible in practice and, what's more, spatially dispersed", and may therefore have taken different forms, such as planting cereals that grow close to the site in their natural state or bringing in cereals from outside their natural areas. At this stage, species selection is unconscious. Plant cultivation is therefore not strictly speaking an "invention", but rather the result of humans imitating what they have observed in nature.

In any case, the idea of rapid evolution and a smooth, linear process must be set aside: domestication is undoubtedly the result of numerous attempts, and the scattered evidence of pre-domestication undoubtedly includes involuntary changes and aborted experiments. Since the early 2000s, the prevailing view among domestication specialists has therefore been that a decisive process began in the PPNA, around 9500 BC, and took roughly a millennium to materialize, or even more. In any case, it is for sites from this period that it has been proposed for the first time to identify the presence of "pre-domestic" agriculture, i.e. with morphologically wild cereals and legumes, using the cluster of clues method. These candidate sites for early domestication are located in the Levant, in the Middle Euphrates region (Jerf el Ahmar, Tell 'Abr 3, Mureybet), in the southern Levant (Zahrat adh-Dhra' 2, Gilgal, Netiv HaGdud), also in southeastern Anatolia (Çayönü) and one case in the western Zagros (Chogha Golan). These findings tend to invalidate the hypothesis of a single center for all domestications throughout the Near East. Migrations and trade between communities probably brought together the mutations made in different places.

Although their fruits were consumed, fruit trees do not seem to have been the subject of domestication attempts in the Neolithic period, or at least they were not successful. A form of fig cultivation was proposed for the Jordan Valley as early as the PPNA, but this did not convince. Even if this were true, it would be an isolated case. At best, during this period, a form of control was practiced over the trees growing near villages and their propagation, so that their fruit could be more easily harvested. Explaining this situation also reveals the advantages of domesticated plants at this time: the vegetative cycle of trees, which meant waiting several years after planting before becoming productive, whereas cereals and legumes became productive the year they were planted; tree pollination, which is generally by cross-fertilization (allogamy), is complex to control, as it requires at least mastery of cuttings and layering to multiply, whereas cereals and legumes reproduce by self-fertilization (autogamy) and only need to be sown to grow.

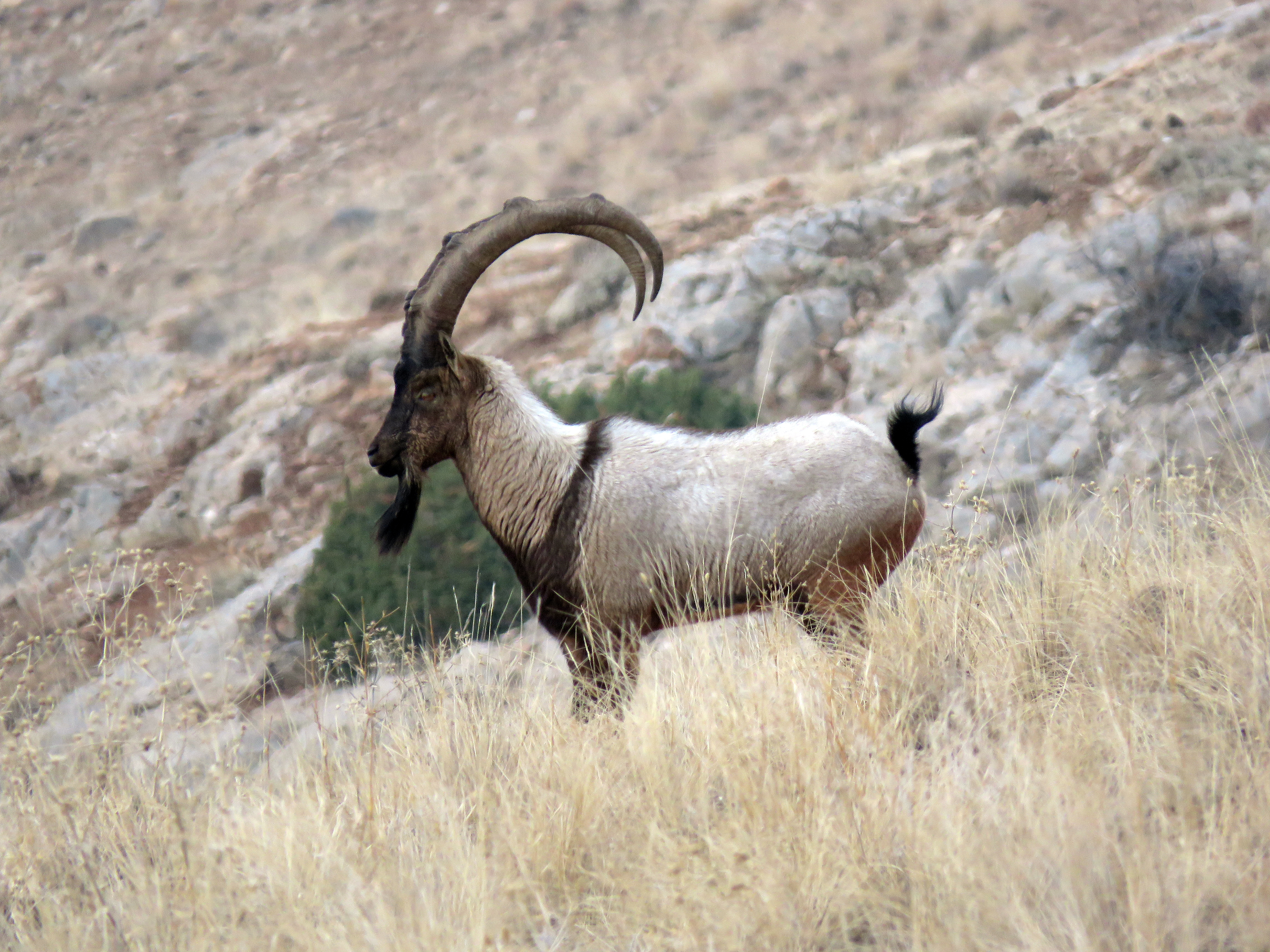
The wild goat, from which the domestic goat is derived.

In the case of animal domestication, the traditional vision was of humans taking control of animals, but the scenarios that have replaced it have rebalanced the relationship between the two: it's more a case of "the intensification of a pre-existing ecological or cultural relationship, reinforced by human intentionality" (J.-D. Vigne). Some even put forward the idea that animals are themselves the decision-makers in their domestication ("self-domestication"), a view that remains in the minority. At the time, it was not possible to determine the extent to which animals were selected consciously or unconsciously, or whether human groups had sought to control female reproduction from the outset. In any case, as with plants, this is not an "invention", but the consequence of new ways for humans to interact with their environment.

Animal domestication seems to derive from the selective hunting practices of the Final Palaeolithic, which favored a limited number of species (gazelle and wild goat in particular) and then led to attempts to control them by capturing isolated individuals (mostly young) or herds of different wild species: oriental mouflon, wild goat (egagre), aurochs, wild boar. These species are gregarious, sociable, and accustomed to living in groups, which facilitates their integration. This leads to taming, which gradually leads to domestication in the strict sense of the term, with controlled reproduction and the emergence of domesticated species such as sheep, goats, cows and pigs. In the case of gazelles, it's possible to assume that the process stopped with taming. Not all animals are "domesticable".

The beginning of the domestication process is difficult to detect in the documentation. In any case, it is clear that at the beginning of the PPNA (c. middle of the 10th millennium BC), selective hunting began to flourish in certain areas, involving a large number of individuals of the same species (the gazelle at Mureybet), and for the end of the PPNA and the beginning of the PPNB (c. 9000 BC), we can assume the beginning of the domestication of animals. It is assumed that sheep herds in the foothills of the Taurus-Zagros arc (e.g. at Körtik Tepe) began to be managed around 9000 B.C. or shortly thereafter, and cattle at Jerf el Ahmar in the Middle Euphrates a little earlier. M. Zeder considers that the domestication of animals began as early as 9500 BC, at the same time as that of plants.

The beginnings of domestication did not immediately lead to strictly speaking agricultural economies, where the subsistence of communities depended mainly on farming and livestock. On the contrary, the societies of the PPNA and the beginning of the PPNB remained overwhelmingly dependent on hunting and gathering, which remained the main form of subsistence in the Near East. Sites where agriculture predominated from this period seem rare, the places where it developed tended to have a mixed profile (between 25% and 75% of subsistence relying on agriculture).

=== The conclusion of domestication ===
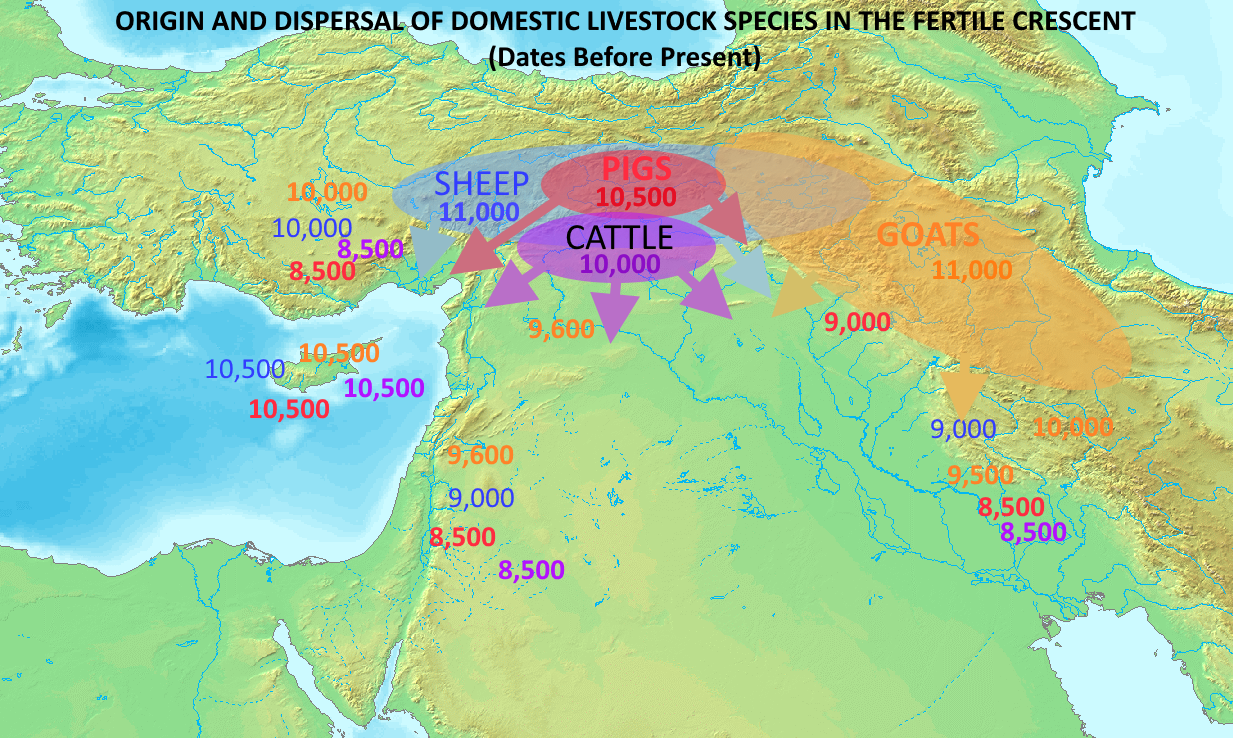
Origin and dispersal of domestic livestock species in the Fertile Crescent (dates Before Present).

After the first experiments and their perpetuation, the phenomenon was consolidated during the Middle and Recent PPNB (after around 8500 BC). The practice of agriculture and animal husbandry spread to other regions, and morphologically domesticated species appeared. It was also during this period that agriculture took on a more important place in subsistence: mixed-profile economies based on both agriculture and foraging became more numerous, even if those oriented essentially on foraging seemed to be more numerous, and there were very few places where agriculture clearly dominated.

The first morphologically domesticated plant species are attested around 8500 BC, notably wheat and barley. Most recent studies conclude that they appeared in several regions at the same time, contrary to the previously widespread view of a single focus, localized between southeastern Anatolia and the northern Levant. Traces of pre-domestic agriculture are followed by those of the first domestic cereals, identified in the northern Levant (Halula presents domestic varieties), southeastern Anatolia (Cafer Höyük, Çayönü, Nevalı Çori), Southern Levant (Ain Ghazal, Jilat 7 and Tell Aswad), Central Anatolia (Aşıklı Höyük, Bonçuklu), Zagros (Chia Sabz, Ganj Dareh, Chogha Golan) and Cyprus (Mylouthkia). The geographical spread is therefore considerable, suggesting several independent domestication episodes for the same plant. It is therefore possible that the pre-domestic agriculture of the PPNA was located in the same places. This seems at least to be confirmed in several cases. In particular, genetic studies seem to corroborate the domestication of barley in the Zagros, a prospect that has long seemed incongruous.

As for animals, traces of domestic-style herd management (of "livestock" or "revenue animals") emerge in the early PPNB. Morphological changes are perceptible roughly from 8700–8200 BC for the four species concerned (sheep, goats, cows and pigs). This is documented above all on sites in the Middle Euphrates and southeastern Anatolia, whose inhabitants seem to have played a leading role in animal domestication. But as with plants, the hypothesis that domestication took place in several regions has gained consistency, at least for goats and sheep, the first domesticated animals. There is evidence of extensive control of goats in the central Levant (Tell Aswad). Genetic studies support the assumption that there were other centers in the Zagros (Ganj Dareh) and the southern Levant. Sheep were domesticated in southeastern Anatolia, but may also have been domesticated in central Anatolia (Aşıklı Höyük) around the same time. As for cattle and wild boar, they only appear to be common at sites in the Upper Tigris and Upper Euphrates region (Cafer Höyük, Çayönü, Nevalı Çori), their sole focus of domestication in the current state of knowledge, towards the end of the 8th millennium BC, and even then still several centuries to spread. It wasn't until the end of the Pre-Ceramic Neolithic, in the second half of the 7th millennium BC, that the four domesticated ungulates were found in all regions of the Middle East.

The PPNB thus saw the consolidation and crystallization of mixed agriculture, combining a base of domesticated cereal and legume crops with a quartet of domesticated ungulates, which became characteristic of the Near Eastern Neolithic and its derivatives, notably that of Europe. It is undoubtedly based on a form of cultivation practiced on plots of land, mixing and alternating several plants, complemented by small-scale livestock farming providing valuable food supplements. All of this adds up to a robust and resilient subsistence system. In addition, it is often pointed out that there are complementarities between early agriculture and animal husbandry, which are not necessarily accidental and give this early agriculture its "agro-pastoral" character: man consumes the grains of domesticated plants but cannot assimilate the cellulose of their stems, unlike domesticated ruminants, which enables a harmonious sharing of harvest products; and the animals in return provide manure to fertilize the fields. It seems that the sites where plant cultivation is developing the most are also those where caprine herding is developing the most rapidly.

Cyprus presents an interesting case study for linking large-scale developments and local specificities, as identified at the Shillourokambos site: wild animals were imported from the mainland before domestication (wild boar, then goats, cattle, fallow deer), which bears witness to animal management practices without domestication; in any case, domesticated ungulates certainly arrived during the last phases of the PPNB. As for local specificities, we assume local domestication of the goat and intensive hunting of fallow deer (after "importing" them to the island), which are not found elsewhere. Domesticated cattle imported from the mainland soon disappeared. Others consider that animals must have arrived domesticated from the earliest times. In any case, this case study is illuminating in that domestications occur "in the context of large-scale, systematic human efforts to modify local environments and biotic communities to increase plant and animal resources of economic interest, a practice that has been characterized as human niche construction or ecosystem engineering" (M. Zeder).

It is in the Cypriot context that the oldest attestation of a potentially domestic cat (derived from the African wildcat) appears. Like dogs, they undoubtedly associated themselves with humans to take advantage of their food resources, before being accepted and welcomed by them. This case reflects the development of the commensal relationship during the Neolithic period, as human groups settled down: rodents (notably house mice) colonized villages, bringing with them predators that were also commensals of humans (felines, also foxes), from which the cat in particular benefited.

== Causes of the beginnings of agriculture ==
2015 VOA report about evidence of early agriculture in the Black Desert of Jordan

What led village communities in the Near East to domesticate plants and animals in the 10th and 9th millennium B.C. is at the heart of debates about the causes of Neolithization, and more broadly, is one of the major questions surrounding the evolution of human societies. In general, the question is why humans abandoned the hunter-gatherer lifestyle that had enabled them to survive for several hundred thousand years

=== One main cause or multiple factors? ===
A number of domestication scenarios have been proposed, but no consensus has been reached. Some proposals are based on a single main cause, others on a combination of several factors, mobilizing, depending on the case, environmental, social, and cultural criteria considered separately or in combination. Taking stock of the state of the question worldwide in 2014, G. Larson et al. consider that:

Explaining the origins of agriculture is still one of the most contentious issues for social scientists. Few dispute that the interplay of climate, human demography, and social systems through time and space played a significant role. Although some consider the primary driving factors to be patterns of climatic and ecological change, others argue for the primacy of social imperatives and changes within social systems. More generally, some scholars have claimed that no explanations are likely to be universally applicable, whereas others have adopted an explicitly comparative approach, identifying parallel processes and exploring common underlying patterns.

Many traditional explanations take into account only one main and determining factor to explain the changes leading to the adoption of agriculture (an "unmoved mover"): climate, environment, demography, social competition, etc. In contrast to this approach, other systemic or multi-factorial interpretations, developed especially from the 1960s onwards, refuse to consider just one primary factor explaining the beginnings of agriculture. They see human societies as systems (an idea taken from cybernetics) in which different factors interact and are likely to influence innovations in different ways, leading in particular to ideas of "co-evolution" of plants and humans. Human decisions play an essential role in the process, especially in the short term, but they are constrained by long-term environmental changes. The phenomenon takes place over a long period and involves "Climate, demography, rational economically motivated decision making, biological responses of plants and animals to human intervention, social opportunities and tensions, as well as a recasting of humankind's place in the universe through ritual and religion, all certainly contribute to this complex story. But they do so in such a tightly interconnected way that it is not possible to single any one factor out as playing a dominant role." (M. Zeder and B. Smith).

=== Subsistence ===
According to popular opinion, domestication is first and foremost intended to stabilize or increase human food resources. This factor, even if not the initial trigger, plays a part in most of the proposed explanations. As far as researchers are aware, plants, and animals are essentially domesticated for food, although this is less obvious for animals, since hunting has long been the main source of meat. Milk may also have been consumed, and we must not rule out the possibility that animal "by-products" played a role from the outset: sheep wool and goat hair may have been used extensively as early as the Neolithic, and dung may have been used as fertilizer.

Nevertheless, it appears that hunter-gatherer societies were able to subsist without farming or animal husbandry. There are even arguments to suggest that the farmer-herder economy is not necessarily more advantageous in terms of food than the hunter-gatherer economy. It is even worse for those who follow M. Sahlins and consider that the latter corresponds to an "age of abundance". Cross-period studies of human remains in the southern Levant seem to indicate that, initially (PPNA and early PPNB), the adoption of the Neolithic way of life led to a deterioration in health conditions, but that with the better mastery of the system in the recent PPNB, the situation improved. Moreover, proposals based on surplus-seeking motivation come up against the fact that there are no major storage structures on Pre-Ceramic Neolithic sites.

=== Weather ===
Global climatic changes at the end of the last ice age, coinciding with the process of Neolithization, led to profound changes in landscape and environment. They played a role in the process, at least in determining the possibilities for domestication, and in preparing the ground for it.

The climatic conditions of the Ice Age and the Younger Dryas and, more broadly, the climatic instability of the Late Pleistocene (before 10,000 BC) are undoubtedly unsuitable conditions for the establishment of plant domestication, whereas the softening phase of the early Holocene and its stability, which coincides with domestications, clearly poses favourable conditions for this process. O. Aurenche, J. Kozlowski and S. Kozlowski consider that the men of the Epipaleolithic period were already mentally and materially ready for Neolithization, but that climatic conditions did not allow them to complete this process before the beginning of the Holocene; for example, the Younger Dryas would have wiped out the farming and stockbreeding experiments that had begun in the Early Natufian.

Others support the idea that climate change may have created "stress" on certain occasions, prompting societies to modify their modes of subsistence, thus establishing a direct link between the two. The first models developed by Raphael Pumpelly (1908) and Gordon Childe (1928 and later) postulated a warming and aridification of the climate, reducing the subsistence possibilities of hunter-gatherers, prompting them to develop agriculture in places where conditions were most favorable ("oasis theory"). Robert Braidwood (1948) transported the most favorable environment for the development of agriculture to the foothills of the Zagros and Taurus ("hilly slopes theory"). However, these models were based on limited climatic data and were abandoned. However, advances in our knowledge of ancient climates have enabled us to refine the links between them and the beginnings of agriculture. O. Bar-Yosef considers that certain Natufian communities faced with the cooling of the Recent Dryas would have sought to intensify the exploitation of their ecological niche, taking advantage of all possible options, including agriculture, which would have led to domestication over the long term.

=== Sedentary lifestyle and demographic pressure ===
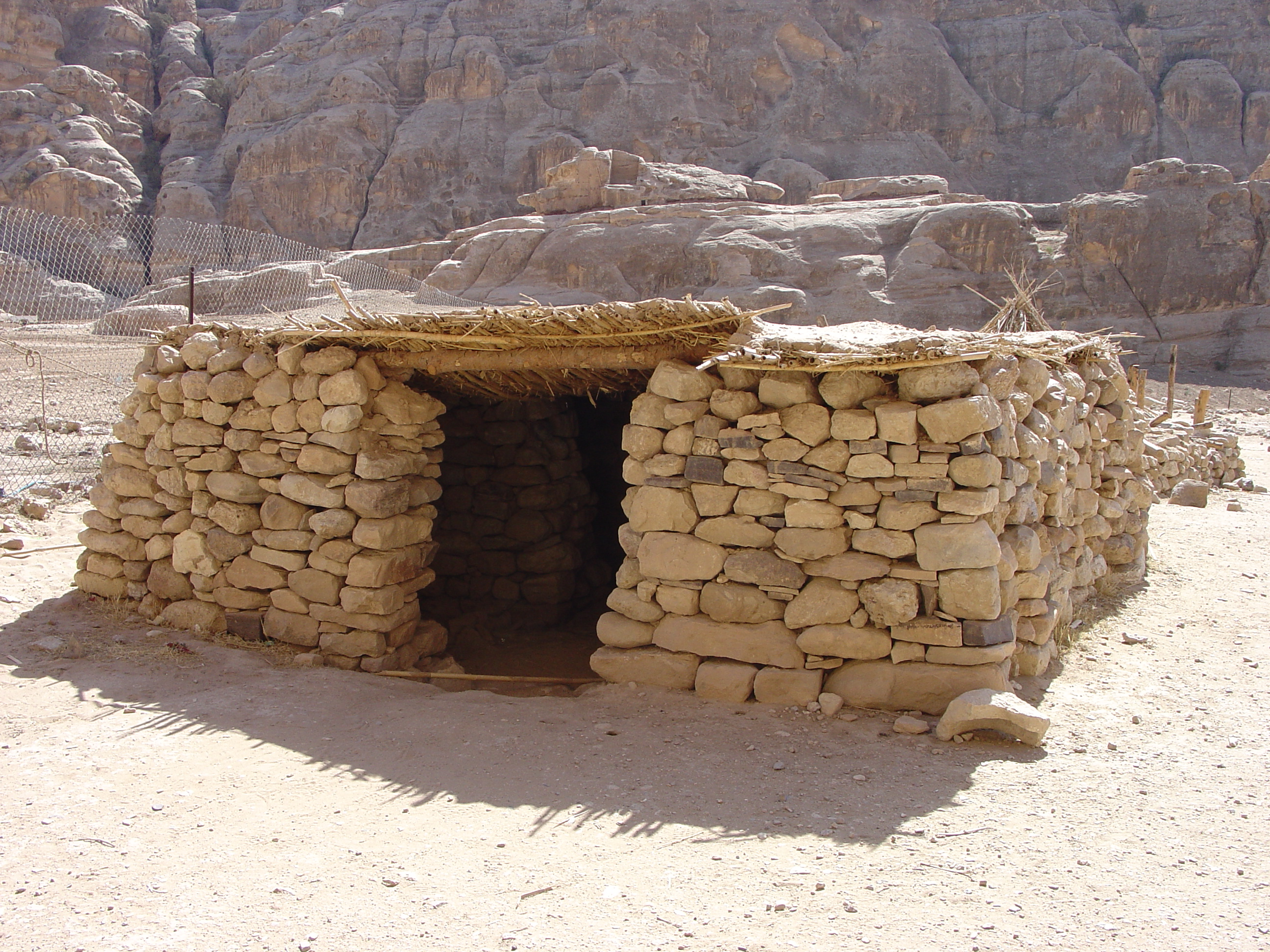
Reconstruction of a Neolithic rectangular house in Beidha, Jordan.

The demographic factor is often presented as a factor explaining the emergence of agriculture.

Sedentariness is at least seen as a necessary condition for the emergence of agriculture, since domestications occur in the context of sedentary hunter-gatherer societies whose resources include plants and animals that are part of the "founding" species. But it is not generally seen as a direct cause. Nevertheless, there is evidence to suggest that factors linked to sedentariness may have stimulated experiments in plant and animal control, leading to domestication. The desire to increase resources through agriculture as a complement to gathering may also have resulted from a quest for greater food security, to make a sedentary lifestyle viable; sedentariness would then have prepared the way for agriculture.

But the supposed impact of sedentariness is more often indirect, through the influence it would have had on demographic pressure: it seems to have caused an increase in fertility and therefore in population, greater exploitation of the environments surrounding village communities, and, in the longer term, greater pressure on access to food resources. All this would have prompted the search for new solutions, and hence the development of agriculture and livestock.

The idea that a form of overpopulation due to a population increase during the Epipaleolithic (whether the cause is sedentariness and/or climate, or other) could have created "stress" and led to a change in subsistence practices is indeed common. The scenarios most representative of this idea are L. Binford's "equilibrium model" and K. Flannery's "broad spectrum revolution": communities with a growing population must share constant food resources between a greater number of individuals, and obtain them from a smaller area. As a result, they modify their subsistence practices (intensification, specialization, or diversification), ultimately leading to farming and livestock rearing (particularly for those migrating to areas with fewer resources). This type of scenario is proposed above all for the southern Levant, where population growth is assumed due to the increase in the number of sites in the Natufian and PPNA.

Others criticize these proposals because, in their view, there is no clear evidence that the pre-Neolithic world was "full", that hunter-gatherers of the time exploited the potential of their environments to the maximum, and exceeded their "carrying capacity". In other words, the maximum population they could feed, given the technical conditions and agricultural practices of the time. What's more, the region most concerned by these proposals, the southern Levant, was not the main site of the first domestications but rather concerned the Middle Euphrates, where settlement was sparse.

=== Social and cultural factors ===
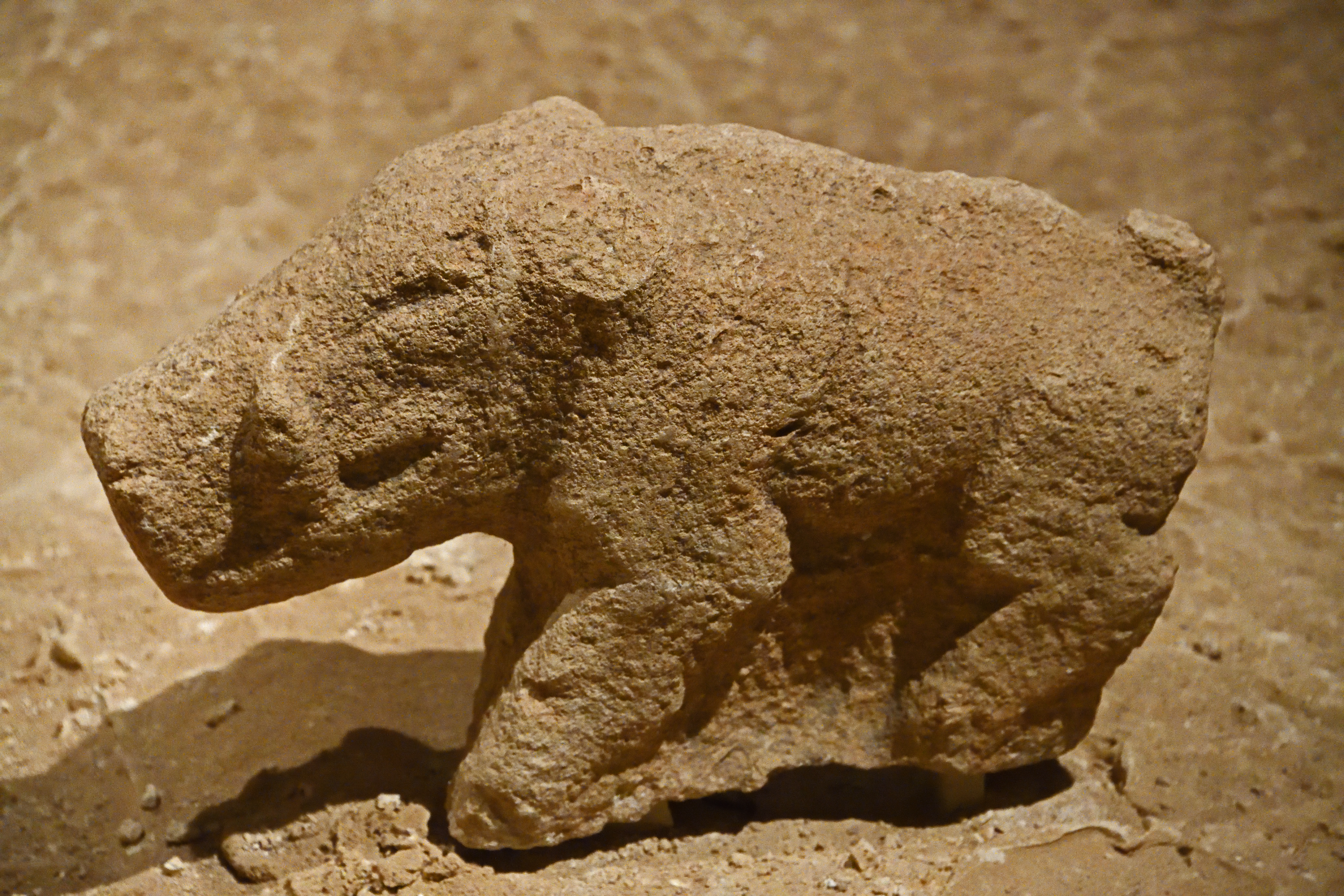
Boar sculpture from Göbekli Tepe. Şanlıurfa Archaeological Museum.

When R. Braidwood and G. Willey sought to understand why hunter-gatherers had not become farmers earlier, they proposed that it was because culture was not yet ready. This paved the way for the search for cultural explanations for Neolithization. But it was mainly from the 1980s onwards that researchers turned to internal, societal and ideological factors to explain the beginnings of agriculture. At the very least, it is accepted that social and mental changes accompany domestication, even if it may seem futile to try and determine which came first.

Early proposed explanations for Neolithization were based on the premise that the first farmers must have learned how plant germination worked to start farming, and that they developed more efficient tools than those of earlier phases. These ideas have since been challenged: there is much less of a gap in knowledge and techniques between them and the last hunter-gatherers than researchers long thought. It is now accepted that Upper Palaeolithic humans had at least a vague knowledge of how plants could reproduce, and therefore potentially had the means to develop agriculture. They may have done so, but due to failed attempts, this does not result in a continuous sequence leading to morphological domestication. Thus, contrary to the proposals of Braidwood and Willey, some consider that man was materially - if not culturally - ready long before the Neolithic.

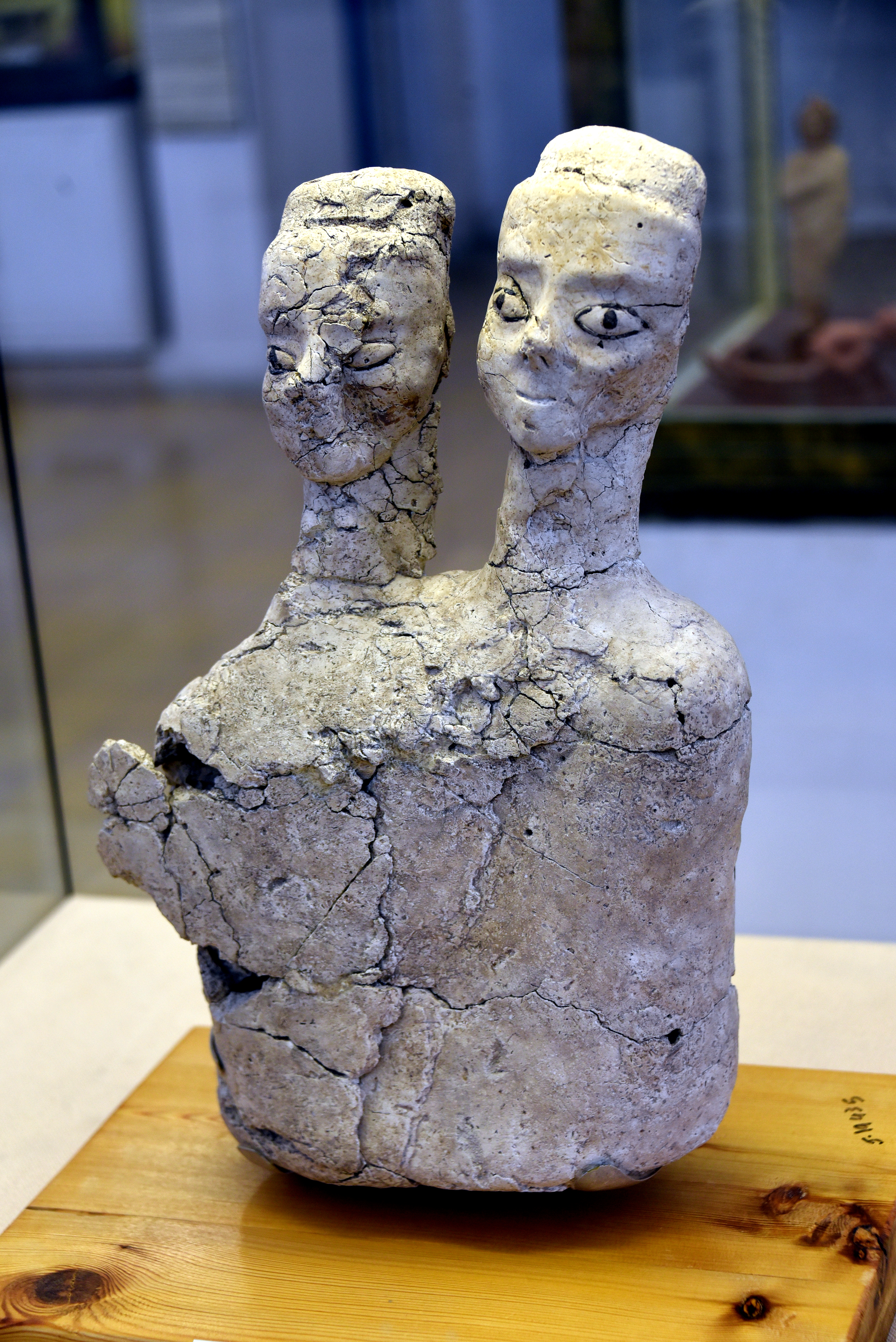
Double-headed statuette from Ain Ghazal, late PPNB (c. 6500 BC). Jordan Archaeological Museum.

Among the most influential works on the cultural and religious approach, those of J. Cauvin derive Neolithization from a "revolution of symbols" occurring at the beginning of the PPNA (Khiamian), which leads him to reject any materialistic explanation and proposes that the origin of agriculture should be sought as the "inauguration of a new behavior of sedentary communities about their natural environment" and of animal husbandry as the product of "a human desire to dominate beasts". This model has not been followed as it stands since it assumes a single focus at Neolithization, which has become less and less convincing over time. It also fails to explain the origin of the ideological revelation on which it is based. But in Cauvin's wake, the study of Neolithic religion has taken on greater importance, and more broadly, the idea that materialistic explanations are not enough has spread.

Other cultural or at least social explanations for the origins of the Neolithic have been put forward, in particular, those postulating that competition and rivalry for social domination played a role in the rise of agriculture. For B. Hayden, the origins of domestication are to be found in festive practices organized by social elites to enhance their prestige and social relations, in a competitive context: in order to redistribute more food and drink to the community and beyond, there was an incentive to produce food surpluses and thus to develop agriculture and animal husbandry. Here again, the arguments for validating this scenario are considered to be limited.

These issues raise questions about the role of knowledge and intentionality in the process: humans have more or less consciously modified their environment and their relationship with plants and animals. They have developed and passed on a whole body of knowledge about crops and livestock (soil management and tillage, farming tools, artificial watering, selection of individuals, castration of animals, etc.). Although difficult to approach, these are key elements in understanding the process of domestication.

== Agro-pastoralism in the Near Eastern Neolithic ==
The agricultural economy gradually developed around Neolithic villages following the first domestication. The result was economic systems based on agriculture and livestock farming, an economy that could be defined as "agro-pastoral" (or "mixed" agriculture) because livestock farming was fully integrated with plant cultivation.

=== The growing importance of agriculture ===
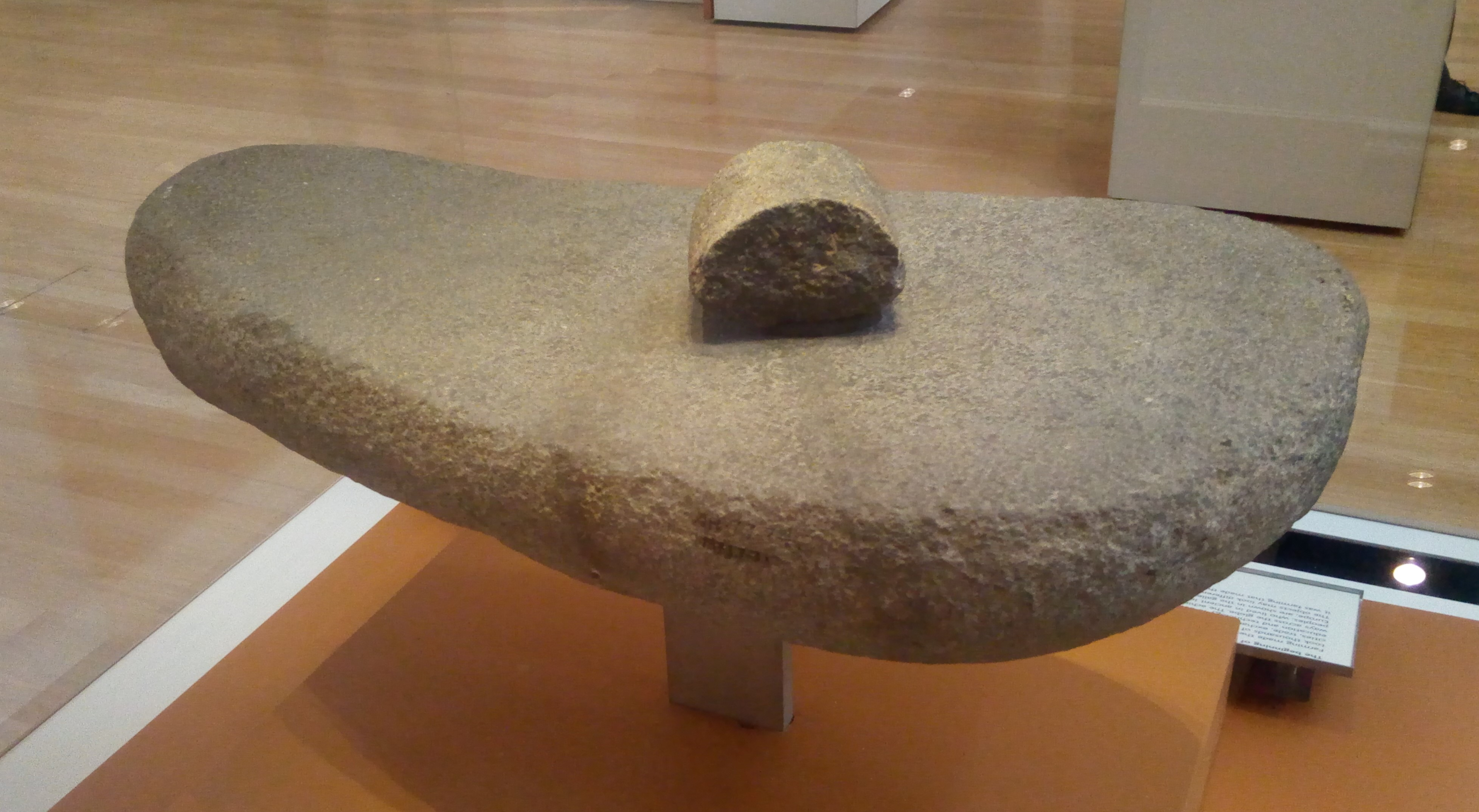
Small and large stone for grinding grain, Abu Hureyra, c. 9500–9000 BC. British Museum.

Gathering and hunting did not disappear with the completion of domestication, if only because many animal and plant species consumed by man were not domesticated. For example, acorns were undoubtedly a useful food supplement in the event of a poor cereal harvest. However, from the PPNB onwards, large villages appeared, whose inhabitants' livelihood depended entirely on agricultural resources and goat breeding. Subsistences based primarily on agriculture became increasingly common after 6500, although those with a mixed profile remained numerous. On the other hand, sites where the economy relied primarily on gathering became rarer. It was also during this period that Neolithic societies spread most rapidly.

Historians generally consider that, towards the end of the PPNB or the beginning of the Ceramic Neolithic, hunting tended to play only a complementary role in the diet. It became a primarily symbolic activity, even if it remained important in certain regions until the end of the Neolithic (for example, gazelle and hemione hunting in northern Syria and northern Iran), and was sufficiently intense to lead to the extinction of certain species. During the Final PPNB in the south-eastern Jordanian desert (c. 7000 BC), in the Jibal al-Khashabiyeh area, a form of mass gazelle hunting developed, using large-scale traps (the "Desert kites"). These traps, combined with encampments and ritual installations, testify to a form of development towards an intensification of the exploitation of animal resources, which nevertheless deviates from the classic model of Neolithization.

As for foraging, it can remain important long after domestication. For example, a study of the Çatal Höyük site showed that around 50% of the plant remains found in three domesticated areas in the period 6700–6300 BC were wild. Even if some of them may have been collected for handicrafts or medical remedies, this indicates that, at this site, diet still depended to a large extent on gathering.

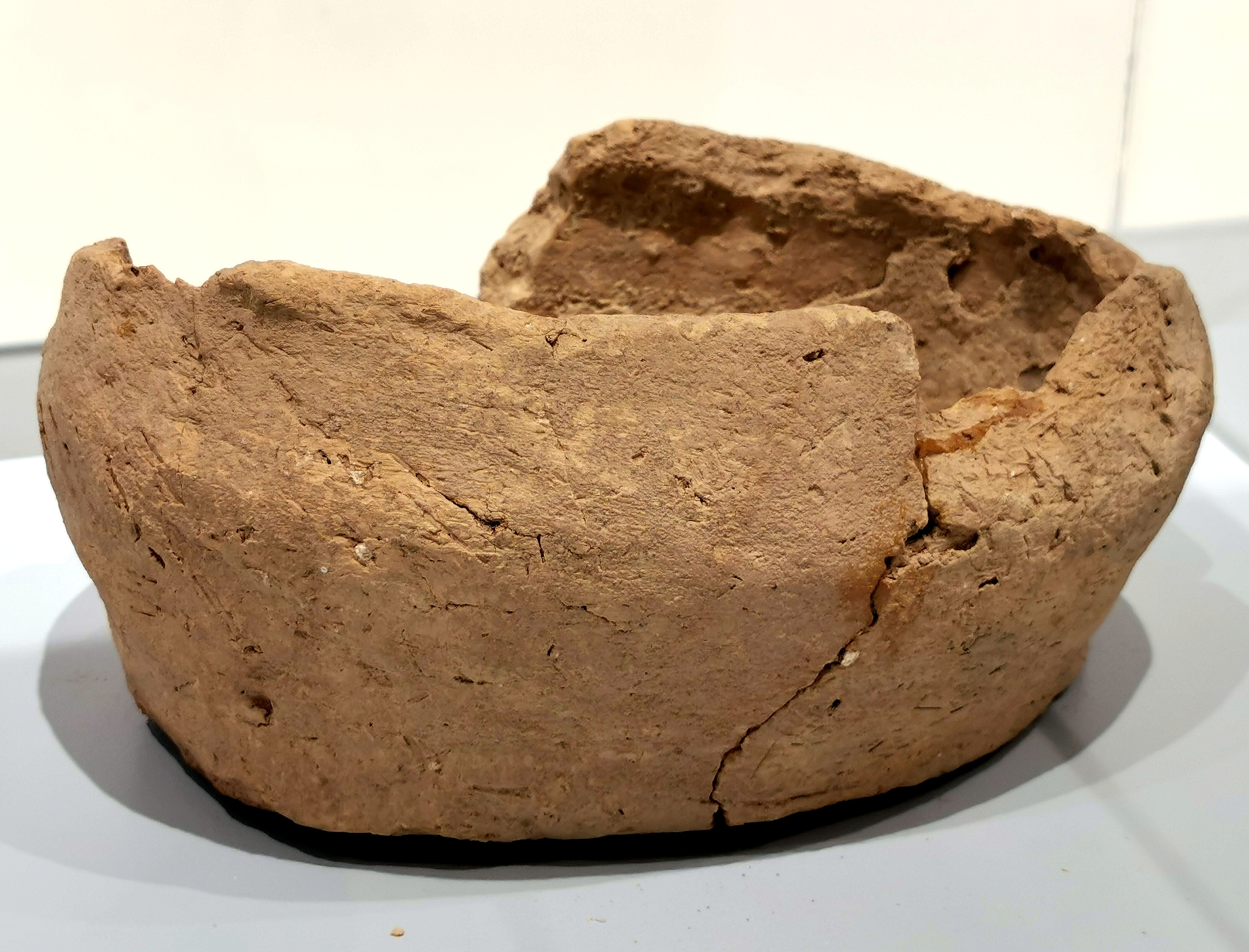
Terracotta bowl from Jarmo, 7th millennium B.C. Souleimaniye Museum.

The development of ceramics during this period is linked to the growth of the agricultural economy and the consumption of its products, as the functions of ceramics seem to have been gradually determined by their makers according to the uses to which they were put. Over time, culinary ceramics - the Neolithic "batterie de cuisine" - developed, consisting of vases resistant to thermal shock and therefore suitable for cooking food, but fragile in the event of mechanical shock, and non-culinary ceramics with the opposite properties, making them suitable for storage but unsuitable for cooking.

Very few studies have been carried out on Neolithic cooking in the Near East, but it seems that cereals were transformed into kinds of wafers or breads (also some sorts of focaccias?) and cookies and, at least from the invention of pottery, into porridges and gruels, in addition to the possible presence of fermented beverages (kinds of beer). Pulses were an essential part of the diet. They are supplemented by meat from domestic or wild animals and picked fruit. This diet was probably established before agriculture, as early as the end of the Epipaleolithic and the beginning of the Pre-Ceramic Neolithic. The increase in milling equipment and domestic ovens at sites from these periods indicates that bread made from cereals (wheat, barley, rye) was becoming increasingly popular. According to D. Fuller and M. Rowlands, culinary differences between Asian cultures began to emerge in these periods. Southwestern Asia developed its cooking practices through oven-baking, as it had long been unaware of the ceramics that could be used to make porridges, which would explain why western Eurasian cultures favored cereals that were better suited to being ground and made into bread, as well as roasted meats. In contrast, East Asia discovered ceramics very early on (18,000 years ago in China), enabling the early development of a culinary tradition favoring boiled and steamed foods, and selecting cereal types more suited to this.

=== Farming practices ===
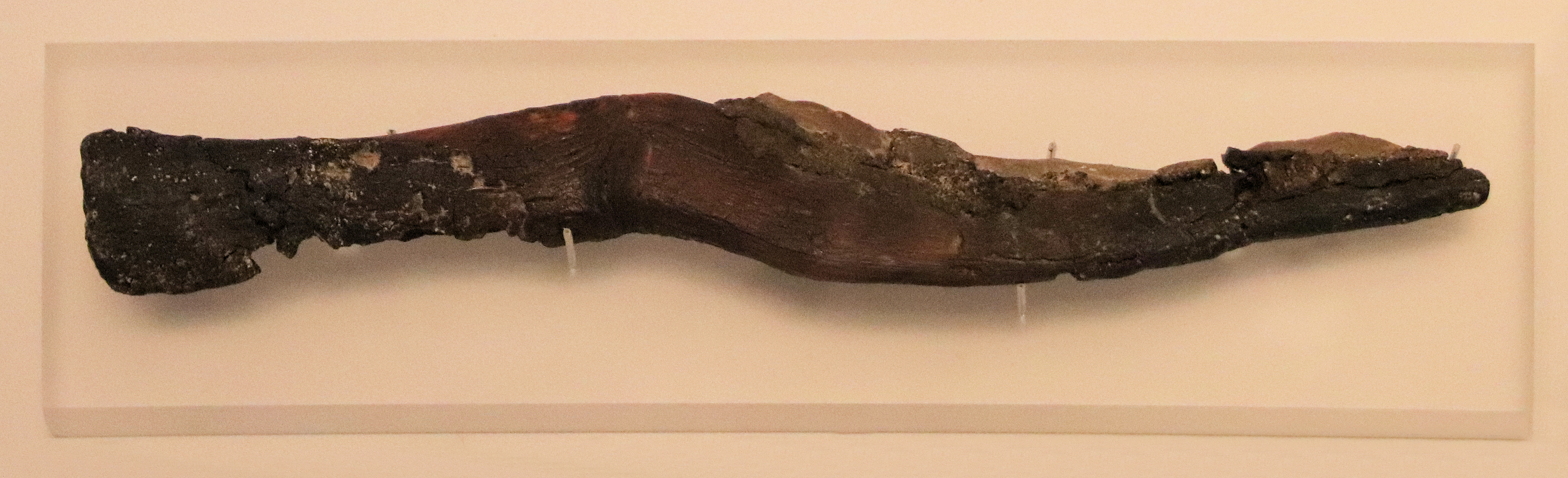
Sickle with three flint blades fixed with resin, from Nahal Hemar (Israel), PPNB.

The agro-pastoral economy of the Near Eastern Neolithic is thought to have been horticultural, intensive rather than extensive. It seems to have been based on the development of small-scale cultivated areas, which, according to A. Bogaard, were a kind of cereal and vegetable garden, where the land was worked by human power alone ('Garden agriculture'). Simple tools were used, such as the hoe for working the soil and the flint sickle for harvesting cereals. It is generally assumed that the ard is not known from this period, for which the use of animal power by humans is generally considered to be non-existent or almost non-existent (see below). However, it has been proposed that the grain-threshing board (or tribulum) existed at least by the end of the Near Eastern Neolithic, and that this instrument was pulled by cattle.

The main crops are barley, starch wheat, lentils, and peas. Cereals are planted between October and December and harvested between April and June. In addition, the shift to an agricultural economy seems to have increased the workload: tilling the fields, watching over the herds and milling the grain requires many hours of labor divided between all members of the community. In any case, analyses of human bones from the Neolithic phases seem to indicate that people in these periods engaged in more physically demanding activities than in earlier periods.

According to the reconstruction proposed for the northern Levant around 7000 BC by P. Akkermans, farming communities were established in areas where dry farming was possible. However, as the Near East is marked by a wide variation in rainfall from one year to the next, some form of irrigation to cope with the driest years is conceivable. Although the technique was practiced as early as the PPNB, from reservoirs and impoundments formed by dams dated to this period and found at Wadi Abu Tulayha in Jordan, it is only attested with certainty at the end of the Neolithic period in central Mesopotamia (at Choga Mami, c. 5900 BC), spreading instead in the 6th millennium BC, on a modest scale. In any case, this technique marks a new stage in the modification of the environment by human action. Before this, even in the most arid areas, it was always possible to take advantage of sites with a better water supply: fields were undoubtedly set up on the terraces and alluvial fans of valleys to protect them from flooding, or near non-perennial watercourses or lakes. Given the documentation available, the ownership structures of the time elude researchers, but there is little doubt that they were an important element in social and economic evolution. The space required for village communities, which probably rarely exceeded a hundred inhabitants, was small, despite the use of fallow land. It is therefore likely that there is a lot of agricultural space to develop, but few hands to do it. What's more, mobility is an integral part of these farmers' strategies: if need be, it enables them to cope with soil exhaustion, dwindling local resources, and problems of access to water.

There is also the possibility of agrarian and environmental crises, or at least long phases of decline. The end of the recent PPNB (c. 7500–7000 BC) seems to be characterized by site abandonment in several regions. This may have been interpreted as a systemic phenomenon: a crisis of pre-Ceramic Neolithic villages or the consequence of a cooler climate. However, analyses of data from the Jordanian site of Ain Ghazal could also point to an over-exploitation of the environment that could explain its abandonment. It has also been suggested that one of the first villages to experiment with agriculture, the Syrian site of Tell Halula, initially experienced growth (c. 8200–7000 BC) before undergoing a phase of decline (c. 7000–5400 BC). This downturn may be attributable to an overemphasis on cereals and over-exploitation of the environment. However, cases of intensive exploitation leading to environmental degradation are probably limited, and examples of villages remaining populated for several centuries, including supposed periods of crisis, are not rare.

An important aspect to highlight is the emergence during the Neolithic period of livestock farming based on seasonal herd movements (transhumance), a phenomenon that has been characterized as "nomadic pastoralism". Although this was a mobile way of life, centered on livestock rather than crops, it was the product of Neolithization, the counterpart and complement of the emergence of farming villages. Thus, during the Halaf period at Tell Sabi Abyad and in the region around it, in eastern Jezirah, there are various indications of a division of communities between, on the one hand, sedentary farmers living in villages and, on the other, nomadic herders occupying temporary sites and sometimes returning to the village. In the Zagros, there is a pattern of organization between villages at the bottom of the valley and satellite camps that can serve as stopping-off points for herders or hunters.

=== The beginnings of large-scale agriculture ===
During the Late Neolithic and Chalcolithic periods (c. 5500–3000 BC), the agricultural economy underwent new changes that characterized the agriculture of the first urban societies.

Another question arises about livestock farming: the use of animal "secondary products". That is, those that do not involve the slaughter of livestock: milk from cows and goats, wool from sheep, goat hair. A. Sherratt has proposed that their exploitation only began in the 4th millennium BC (a "secondary products revolution"). However, there are indications that dairy products were used as early as the ceramic Neolithic, and some even consider that cattle milking was important from the very beginning of domestication. As for the use of animal fibers in textiles, little is documented before historic times; it seems that the first domesticated sheep did not have a woolly fleece thick enough to attest to significant use at that time. The same applies to animal traction: cattle may have been used for this purpose during the Neolithic period, but probably on a domestic scale and to a limited extent. Even if it doesn't necessarily deserve to be called a "revolution", raising animals for purposes other than meat doesn't really seem to take off until the emergence of more important political and economic institutions, in the 4th millennium BC (which corresponds to the Late Chalcolithic period in the Near East). This period also saw the arrival in these regions of the domesticated donkey, a pack animal of great importance in the ancient Near East.

During the Neolithic period, fruit was gathered from wild trees. It was perhaps as early as the end of the 6th millennium BC and the beginning of the 5th millennium BC (Early Chalcolithic) that the process of domesticating fruit trees began in the Middle East. This led to the birth of arboriculture, the aim of which was vegetative propagation (cuttings, layering, grafting). The phenomenon is best illustrated by the growing presence of vine, fig, olive, date palm, and other fruit trees. Fruit crops became widespread in the Middle East, particularly from the end of the 4th millennium BC onwards, and were fully integrated into the region's agricultural economy. This, too, was a major change in the economy of late Neolithic and Chalcolithic societies, since it required more investment than the cultivation of cereals and legumes (trees and shrubs had to be maintained regularly and were only productive several years after planting).

The development of tree crops accompanied a more profound change in the cultivation of plants, which took place in the context of the development of urban and state institutions. These were able to generate larger surpluses, capable of feeding an ever-growing non-peasant population. This phenomenon is particularly evident in southern Mesopotamia (Uruk period), where, at least by the end of the 4th millennium B.C., irrigated agriculture began to flourish, with cereal crops being the mainstay. The introduction of the plough, and hence the use of animal traction, made it possible to plough and thus cultivate larger agricultural areas than before - real fields, generally in the form of elongated plots, one end of which was supplied with water by a canal. Animal power could also be used to transport produce and thresh grain.

== "Revolutionary" consequences ==
The domestication of animals and plants was part of a series of major changes known as the "Neolithic revolution", or more simply "Neolithization". These upheavals in human society undeniably constitute an irreversible mutation of major importance in the history of mankind. The process of inventing agriculture is not, strictly speaking, part of the "Neolithic revolution": it is the cause of it, and it is its consequences that have a "revolutionary" aspect. This leads to the establishment of a Neolithic "way of life", encompassing technological, economic, social and ideological aspects. According to N. Goring-Morris and A. Belfer-Cohen:

The concept of Neolithization involved much more than the domestication of plants and animals, for the processes of Neolithization also involved the 'domestication' of fire (pyrotechnological developments ultimately leading to the production of pottery) and water (management in the form of wells and irrigation). In addition, and of paramount importance, social "domestication" with new ways of shaping community identity and interaction, whose very essence changed; these ranged from bonding through kinship, exchange networks, craft specialization, feasting, etc., to rivalry, political boundaries and intra- and inter-community conflictual violence. Ultimately, the "Neolithic revolution", in the Near East at least, was a long-term, gradual and undirected process, marked by threshold events, the outcome of which was by no means certain.

Domestication implies that man controls the species he domesticates: he sows and harvests, selects and parks animals, and decides which ones are to be slaughtered. A symbiosis is also created between the domesticating species and the domesticated species, and is characterized as "coevolution": "the plant needs human intervention for its reproduction; human societies depend on agricultural production for their subsistence". Domestication is at the root of the ability of human societies to transport large numbers and varieties of plants and animals out of their natural habitats, setting in motion a long-term process of expansion and demographic growth that is set to revolutionize the future of human societies and their environment on a global scale.

One of the major long-term consequences of neolithization is population growth. This can be seen above all in the increase in the number of sites and regions occupied by farming communities. The causes seem to be the increased availability of cereals and legumes thanks to agriculture, shorter birth intervals due to sedentarization, and a reduction in energy expenditure compared to the old way of life. Nevertheless, mortality also increased, particularly among children. The domestication of animals may have led to the transmission of animal diseases to man (zoonoses). As a result, life expectancy does not necessarily increase during the transition from Paleolithic to Neolithic.

The emergence and expansion of agriculture and animal husbandry also led to profound changes in the way humans interacted with their environment, increasing their capacity to modify it. The establishment of the agro-pastoral economy led to an uninterrupted process of environmental modification, which from the outset involved expansion into new regions; the manipulation of plants and animals, leading to their genetic modification (artificial selection); and then their dispersal outside their natural environment, modifying even more ecosystems. These changes in turn had an impact on humans, who had to adapt to the changes they brought to the objects of domestication, having to adjust their cultivation practices to feed the animals or implement water management practices (leading to the advent of irrigation). Demographic growth due to the adoption of agriculture and animal husbandry also encouraged this expansion. The phenomenon is thus marked by feedback loops, with consequences having amplifying effects on what caused them.

The links between the beginnings of agriculture and animal husbandry and the widening of social inequalities are debated. Admittedly, the possibilities for accumulating wealth (land and animals) seem to have increased in comparison with collector societies, and differences in access to land (and in particular to good agricultural land) are a factor in increasing these inequalities. However, agricultural or pastoral societies are not necessarily marked by pronounced inequalities, especially if land is cultivated collectively and farming remains low-productivity. Other factors come into play to amplify social inequalities, notably the transmission of wealth between generations.

This phenomenon has had a profound impact on mankind, affecting all areas of social life. The domestication of animals brought with it a series of utilitarian, economic, biological and social changes, with the creation of communities of people and animals. These changes are also symbolic, with the eventual distinction between wild animals, which are outside human society (and threaten it), and domesticated animals, which are fully part of it. This institutes a new form of domination. What's more, by building a society with domesticated animals, man is led to change himself, by adapting to his partners, who cannot be reduced to mere dominated beings.

In the longer term, the beginnings of agriculture and the "Neolithic revolution" paved the way for political and social changes, which led to the establishment of societies with greater social diversity and more marked hierarchies, including the "urban revolution" of the 4th millennium BC, and are still at the root of modern societies; according to P. Edwards:

The accumulation of food surpluses freed elite professionals, artisans‚ and laborers to perform the different social and economic functions that were required in the first complex societies. Today all urban, sedentary‚ and socially stratified societies are dependent on agricultural surpluses grown by farmers for their ultimate wealth, and these resources all derive from the ancient village way of life.

It has also been argued that the transition from hunter-gatherer to farmer is not advantageous overall: food is less varied, habitats more densely populated, the constraints posed by droughts and epidemics greater, new diseases appear, social inequalities widen and agricultural work is more tedious than hunting and gathering. At the very least, this idea serves to support the notion that humans must have been driven to adopt the Neolithic way of life, rather than attracted to it.

The introduction of agriculture and animal husbandry, and of the Neolithic way of life in general, was rapidly accompanied by the spread of these innovations to regions close to the Near Eastern hearths. Genetic studies tend to indicate that this spread was largely due to migration, rather than adoption through contact. The case has been well put forward for Europe, which neolithized from 6500 BC via Greece and the Balkans, adopting plants and animals domesticated in the Near East, via Anatolia (and even Cyprus). Species domesticated in the Near East also spread eastwards, to the Indian subcontinent, where the principle of domestication was quickly put to use to domesticate local species (such as zebu and cotton), to Central Asia and, through there, to China, which was already a hotbed of independent domestication (millet and rice). From the Levant, domesticated species also spread to Lower Egypt (Fayoum A) and then to neighboring African regions.

Diffusion extended even further; according to G. Willcox:

In the Near East, the establishment of mixed farming based on wheat, barley, pulses, and herding of sheep, goat, cattle, and pigs was particularly productive and as a result spread rapidly to Europe and Central Asia. It fueled the civilizations of Mesopotamia, Egypt, Greece, and Rome. European colonialists introduced these species into many parts of the world.

== Worldwide comparisons ==
The Near East is the region where Neolithization is best documented and studied. It is, moreover, generally considered to be the first region to have seen the beginnings of agriculture, although it is possible that earlier foci existed in tropical regions where archaeobotanical remains are very poorly preserved. Advances in knowledge of the Neolithization process in other parts of the world have brought new data to the debate.

The transition from Palaeolithic to Neolithic occurs in other parts of the world during the early Holocene (c. 10000–7000 BC) and also the mid-Holocene (c. 5000–2000 BC): at least 11 of these "primary" domestication centers have been identified, but there could be as many as twenty. The coincidence of the emergence of these different domestications, without any direct link between them, throughout five millennia, which is compared to the 300,000 years of Homo sapiens, can no doubt be explained in part by the evolution of human psychic capacities, and undoubtedly by the change in environmental conditions on a global scale following the end of the last Ice Age. If we compare the different centers, it seems that at least three main elements must be present for neolithization to occur: a favourable, stable environment, a certain level of technology and, finally, the will to carry out actions that modify the relationship between humans and the environment over time. The result, however, varies greatly from place to place.

Indeed, what has been observed in the rest of the world often has at least general similarities with what is happening in the Near East, but also more or less marked differences. This has shown that the path followed by this part of the globe is not the only one possible. In addition to the fact that the beginnings of agriculture took place in different environmental conditions, which implied the domestication of different species (and animals were not domesticated in all households), these developments were the product of societies with very contrasting profiles. What's more, agriculture and animal husbandry are not necessarily destined to play a leading role until several millennia after their appearance. There is therefore no single way of making the transition from the Palaeolithic to the Neolithic, and the Near Eastern case (with the agro-pastoral Neolithic Europe derived from it) should not be regarded as an emblematic model.

The growth of studies on the beginnings of agriculture has been particularly significant in China, where the phenomenon began a little later (7000 BC). This region has many similarities with the Near East: domestication here too seems to have passed through phases of intensive, pre-domestic exploitation. In the south (Yangtze Basin), the focus was on rice, while in the north (Yellow River Basin), the first domestications of cereals (proso millet and foxtail millet), legumes (soybean) and animals (dog and pig) accompanied the development of village cultures. From a technical point of view, ceramics appeared here before the beginnings of agriculture, overturning the idea established in the Near East that ceramics only developed after agriculture. Other regions of the world are farther removed from the Near East, where agriculture and livestock breeding, although they developed and spread, did not necessarily play a central role in subsistence as quickly. This is the case of the Oceanian world: New Guinea developed agriculture around the 5th millennium BC, as known from the Kuk site. It was of a tropical type, very different from that of the Near East: domestication of yams, taro and bananas, clearing of forests for cultivation, early introduction of irrigation techniques. Agriculture spread to the Oceanian islands, but given their small size, its development was limited, while fishing, hunting and gathering played an important role. The Americas (where several households are located) offer a different situation: there are few domesticable and domesticated animal species, plant domestications are varied, but only a limited number seem to play a major role in the diet (corn, beans, potatoes, gourds). In Mesoamerica, the Oaxaca Valley (Mexico) provides an example of the development of agriculture, perhaps as early as c. 8700-8000 BC, but village societies did not develop until several millennia later. However, the Andean world offers an earlier case of the appearance of village cultures. But in many regions where horticulture is known, it appears to have served only as a supplement to hunting and gathering (notably in Amazonia). In West Africa, pearl millet appears to have been the only species cultivated until the Iron Age (middle of the 1st millennium BC), before the development of agroforestry combining millet with tree species and legumes.

== See also ==
- Neolithic in the Near East
- Neolithic Revolution
- Pre-Pottery Neolithic
- Prehistory of the Levant

== Bibliography ==
- This article is partly or entirely taken from the article named "w:fr:Néolithique du Proche-Orient "

=== Prehistory, Neolithic ===
- Renfrew, Colin Renfrew (2014). The Cambridge World Prehistory. Cambridge: Cambridge University Press.
- Demoule, Jean-Paul (2009). La révolution néolithique dans le monde. Paris: CNRS éditions.
- Foster McCarter, Susan (2007). Neolithic. New York: Routledge.
- Aurenche, Olivier; Kozlowski, Janusz K.; Kozlowski, Stefan K. (2013). "To be or not to be… Neolithic: "Failed attempts" at Neolithization in Central and Eastern Europe and in the Near East, and their final success (35,000-7000 BP)". Paléorient. 39 (2): 5–45. doi:10.3406/paleo.2013.5519.
- Bogaard, Amy (2015). "Communities". In Barker, Graeme; Goucher, Candice (eds.). The Cambridge World History: Volume II: A World With Agriculture. Cambridge: Cambridge University Press. pp. 124–160.

=== Neolithic in the Near East ===
- Aurenche, Olivier; Kozlowski, Stefan K. (2015). La naissance du Néolithique au Proche-Orient. Biblis. CNRS Editions. p. 343. ISBN 978-2-271-08601-3.
- Cauvin, Jacques (1997). Naissance des divinités, naissance de l'agriculture: La Révolution des symboles au Néolithique. Champs. Flammarion. p. 310. ISBN 978-2-08-081406-7.
- M. M. G. Akkermans, Peter; M. Schwartz, Glenn (2003). The Archaeology of Syria: From Complex Hunter-Gatherers to Early Urban Societies (c.16,000-300 BC). Cambridge: Cambridge University Press.
- Munro, Natalie; Grosman, Leore (2018). "The Forager–Farmer Transition in the Southern Levant (ca. 20000–8500 cal. BP)". In Yasur-Landau, Assaf; Cline, Eric H.; Rowan, Yorke (eds.). The Social Archaeology of the Levant: From Prehistory to the Present. Cambridge: Cambridge University Press. pp. 47–66.

=== Domestications ===
- Clarke, Joanne (2013). "Cyprus During the Neolithic Period". In Killebrew, Ann E.; Steiner, Margreet (eds.). The Oxford Handbook of the Archaeology of the Levant: c. 8000-332 BCE. Oxford University Press. pp. 190–191.
- Helmer, Daniel (1992). La domestication des animaux par les hommes préhistoriques. Préhistoire. Paris: Masson.
- Snir, Ainit; Nadel, Dani; Groman-Yaroslavski, Iris; Melamed, Yoel; Sternberg, Marcelo; Bar-Yosef, Ofer; Weiss, Ehud (2015). "The Origin of Cultivation and Proto-Weeds, Long Before Neolithic Farming". PLOS ONE. 10 (7) e0131422. Bibcode:2015PLoSO..1031422S. doi:10.1371/journal.pone.0131422. PMC 4511808. PMID 26200895.
- Vigne, Jean-Denis (2004). Les débuts de l'élevage. Paris: Le Pommier.
- Vigne, Jean-Denis (2009). "Les débuts de l'élevage des ongulés dans l'Ancien Monde : interactions entre société et biodiversité". In Demoule, Jean-Paul (ed.). La Révolution néolithique dans le monde. Paris: CNRS éditions. pp. 145–164.
- Zeder, Melinda A.; Smith, Bruce D. (2009). "A Conversation on Agricultural Origins: Talking Past Each Other in a Crowded Room". Current Anthropology. 50 (5): 681–691. Bibcode:2009CurrA..50..681Z. doi:10.1086/605553.
- Zeder, Melinda A. (2011). "The Origins of Agriculture in the Near East". Current Anthropology. The Origins of Agriculture: New Data, New Ideas. 52 (S4): 221–235. doi:10.1086/659307. JSTOR 10.1086/659307.
- Weiss, Ehud; Zohary, Daniel (2011). "The Neolithic Southwest Asian Founder Crops: Their Biology and Archaeobotany". Current Anthropology. The Origins of Agriculture: New Data, New Ideas. 52 (S4): 237–254. Bibcode:2011CurrA..52S.237W. doi:10.1086/658367. JSTOR 10.1086/658367.
- Willcox, George (2012). "The Beginnings of Cereal Cultivation and Domestication in Southwest Asia". In T. Potts, Daniel (ed.). Blackwell companions to the ancient world. Blackwell Publishers. pp. 163–180.
- Tengberg, Margareta (2012). "Fruit Growing". In T. Potts, Daniel (ed.). A Companion to the Archaeology of the Ancient Near East. Blackwell companions to the ancient world. pp. 181–200.
- Arbuckle, Benjamin S. (2012). "Animals in the Ancient World". In T. Potts, Daniel (ed.). A Companion to the Archaeology of the Ancient Near East. Blackwell companions to the ancient world. Blackwell Publishers. pp. 201–219.
- Asouti, Eleni; Fuller, Dorian Q. (2013). "A Contextual Approach to the Emergence of Agriculture in Southwest Asia: Reconstructing Early Neolithic Plant-Food Production". Current Anthropology. 54 (3): 299–345. doi:10.1086/670679.
- Willcox, George (2014a). "Les premiers indices de la culture des céréales au Proche-Orient". In Manen, C.; Perrin, T.; Guilaine, J. (eds.). La transition néolithique en Méditerranée. Actes du colloque Transitions en Méditerranée, ou comment des chasseurs devinrent agriculteurs, Toulouse, 14-15 avril 2011. pp. 47–58.
- Willcox, George (2014b). "Near East (Including Anatolia): Origins and Development of Agriculture". In Smith, Claudia (ed.). Encyclopedia of Global Archaeology. Springer. pp. 7695–7709. doi:10.1007/978-1-4419-0465-2_2272. ISBN 978-1-4419-0426-3.
- Larson, Greger; Piperno, Dolores R.; Allaby, Robin G. (2014). "Current perspectives and the future of domestication studies". Proceedings of the National Academy of Sciences. Vol. 111. pp. 6139–6146. doi:10.1073/pnas.132396411.
- Vigne, Jean-Denis (2018). "Domestication". Dictionnaire de l'humain. Nanterre: Presses universitaires de Paris Nanterre. pp. 143–150.
- Tengberg, Margareta (2018). "Des premières pratiques agricoles à la domestication des plantes". In Demoule, Jean-Paul; Garcia, Dominique; Schnapp, Alain (eds.). Une histoire des civilisations: Comment l'archéologie bouleverse nos connaissances. Paris: La Découverte. pp. 185–187.
- Edwards, Phillip C. (2021). "The Beginnings of Agriculture". In Hollander, David; Howe, Timothy (eds.). A Companion to Ancient Agriculture. Hoboken: Wiley-Blackwell. pp. 121–148.
- Fuller, Dorian Q.; Lucas, Leilani (2025). "Contrasting pathways to domestication and agriculture around Southwest Asia". Archaeological and Anthropological Sciences. 17 (74) 74: 74. Bibcode:2025ArAnS..17...74F. doi:10.1007/s12520-025-02190-x.
