= Nahal Tavor =

Stream and nature reserve in Israel

- Wadi al-Bireh
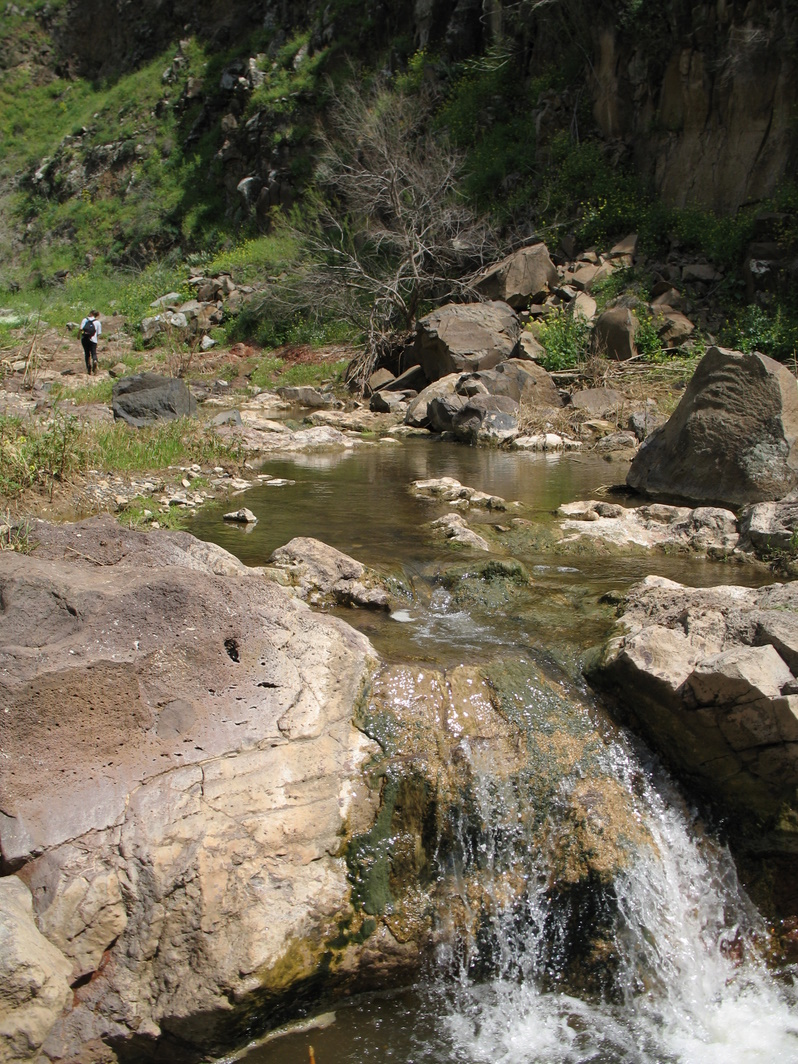
- Tavor stream (Nahal Tavor)

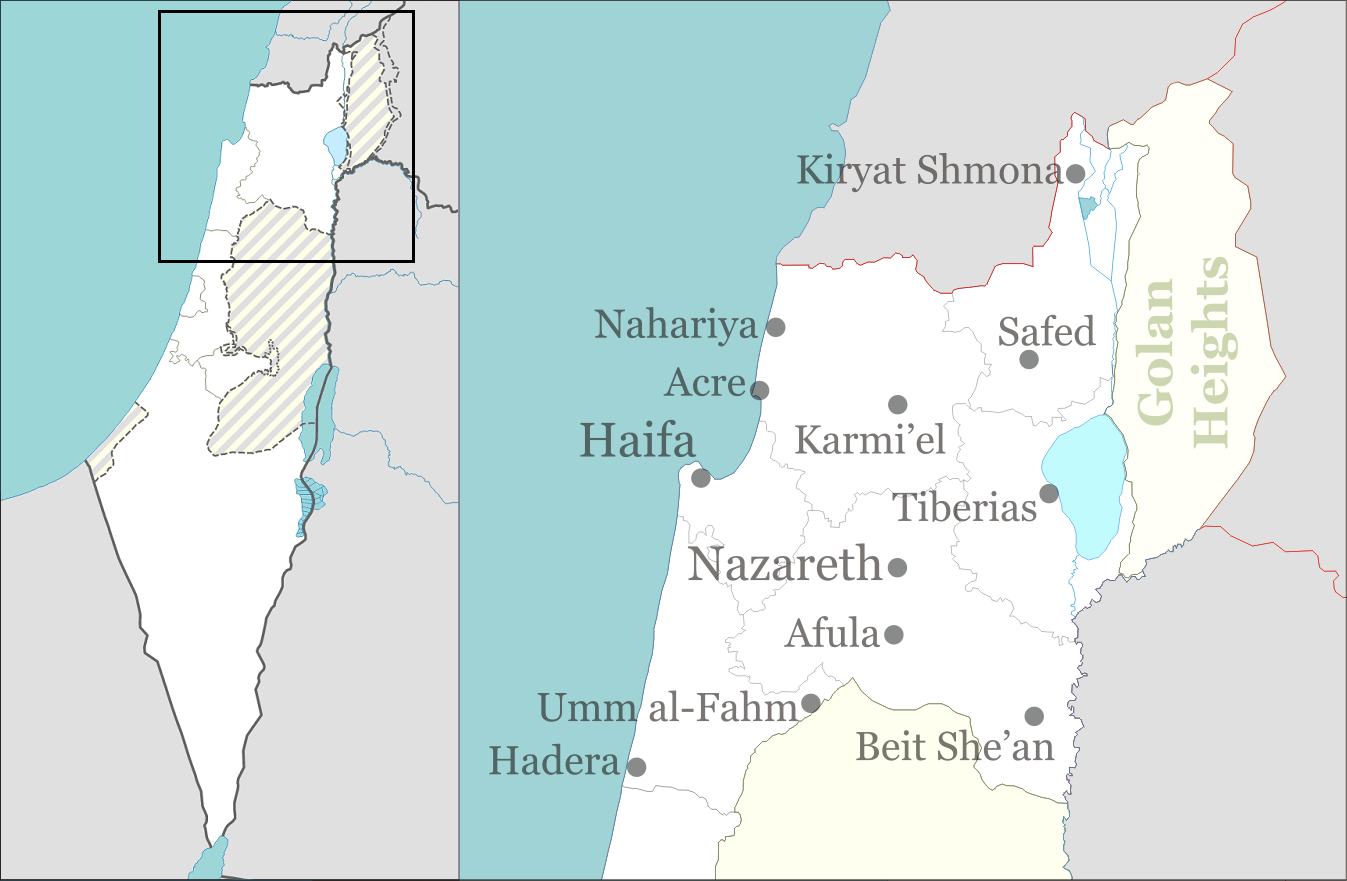
- Location within Northern Haifa region of Israel
- Location: Lower Galilee, Israel
- Coordinates: 32°39′8.58″N 35°27′47.45″E
- Established: 1974

Nahal Tavor (Hebrew: נחל תבור; Arabic: وادي البيره, Wadi al-Bireh), lit. Tabor Stream, is an intermittent stream in the Lower Galilee, Israel.

== Geography ==
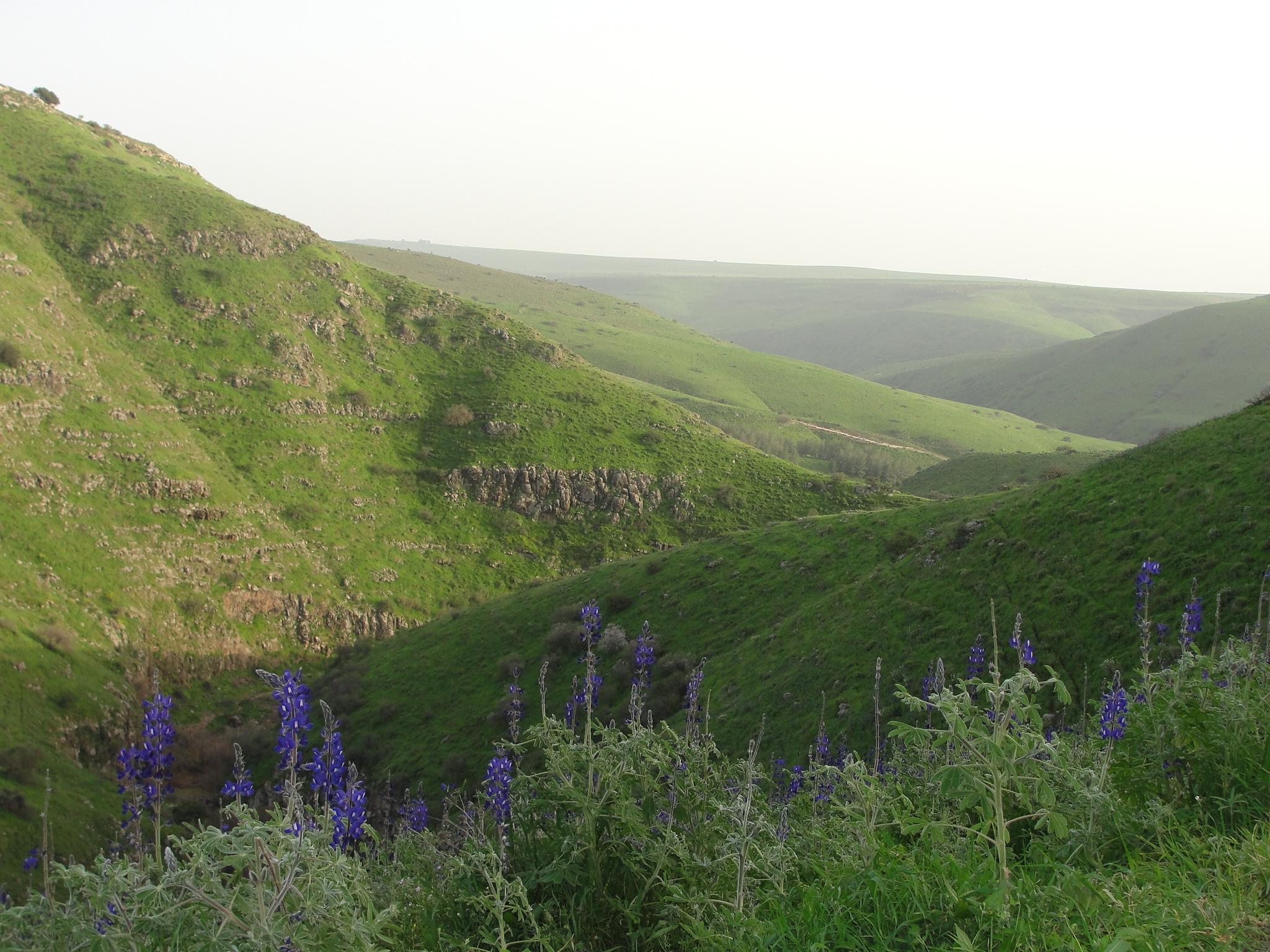
Nahal Tavor looking south-east, lupines in the foreground

The stream starts in the hills of Nazareth, east of the city, and runs east and south of Mount Tabor, where it turns east and then empties into the Jordan River between Gesher and Belvoir Fortress.

Three springs feed the stream within the boundaries of the Nahal Tavor Nature Reserve: Ein Rechesh, Ein Ze'ev, and Ein Shachal. Ein Rechesh is near Tel Rekhesh/Tell el-Mukharkhash, an archaeological tell thought to be Anaharath, a town mentioned in the description of one of Thutmose III's campaigns, and also in Joshua 19:19, describing the allotment of the Tribe of Issachar. After 13 excavation campaigns executed between 2006 and 2023, it was concluded that site was almost continuously occupied from the Early Bronze Age to the Byzantine period. A large Assyrian 7th or 6th century BCE fortified structure containing several halls and plastered baths was discovered there. A scarab-shaped carnelian seal bearing the carved image of a winged animal (griffin?) was found at the foot of the tell in 2024, of possibly Assyrian or Babylonian age, which could be proof of Tel Rekhesh serving as an administrative centre at the time. An Early Roman period (first–second centuries CE) synagogue stood in the highest (northeast) area of the mound (Area G).

Near Kibbutz Gazit, the stream runs through a basalt canyon.

== Nature reserve ==
The Tabor Stream received nature reserve status in 1974.

The nature reserve encompasses the stream from the area near Kfar Kish up to Highway 90.

Flora includes Tamarix, Willow, Ziziphus spina-christi, Pistacia atlantica, Faidherbia albida, and Prunus korshinskyi trees. Many wildflowers grow during the winter months, such as Lupins (Lupinus pilosus), Cyclamen persicum, Anemones, Chives, and Asafoetida.

Fauna in the reserve includes gazelles (Gazella gazella gazella), Spanish sparrows and Alectoris partridges.
