= Chogha Golan =

Neolithic archaeological site in Iran

- Chogha Khulaman
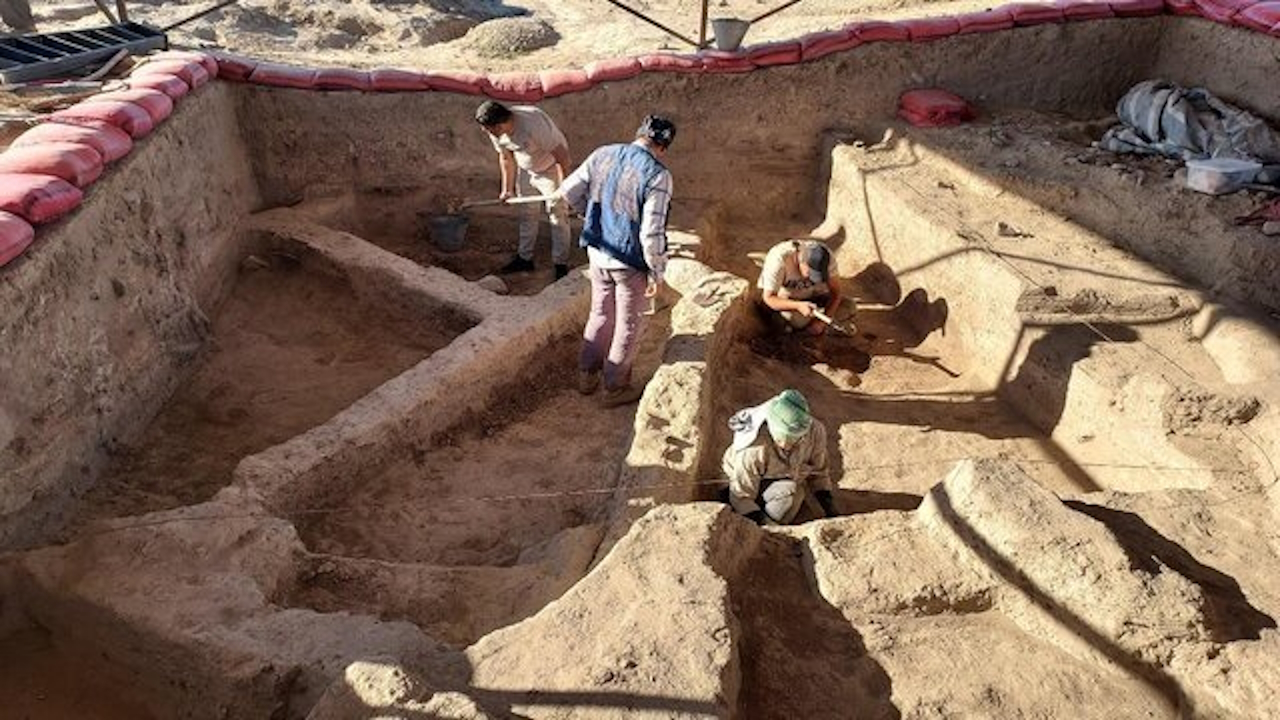
- Chogha Golan, a Neolithic archaeological site located in the foothills of the Zagros Mountains in Ilam province

- Location in Iran
- 33°22′38.50″N 46°16′15.93″E
- Periods: Aceramic Neolithic
- Location: Ilam Province, Iran
- Region: Amirabad Plain

History
- Built: ca. 12,000 BP
- Abandoned: ca. 9,600 BP

Site notes
- Elevation: 485 m (1,591 ft)
- Area: 2 ha (215,278 sq ft)
- Excavation dates: 2009, 2010

Chogha Golan is an aceramic Neolithic archaeological site in the foothills of the Zagros Mountains in Iran, about 200 m (656 ft) from the right bank of the Konjan Cham River. Located in a semi-arid region about 30 km (19 mi) north of Mehran, Chogha Golan is one of the earliest aceramic Neolithic sites found in Iran. The people of Chogha Golan relied primarily on the exploitation of wild plants and hunting. Chogha Golan is notable for the early presence of domesticated emmer wheat, dating to around 9,800 BP as such the archaeobotanical remains from Chogha Golan shows the earliest record of long-term plant management in Iran.

== Archaeology ==
Chogha Golan was jointly excavated by archaeologists from the University of Tübingen and the Iranian Center for Archaeological Research in 2009 and 2010. The site consists of a tell with a height of about 7–8 m (23–26 ft). Chogha Golan contains 8 m (26 ft) of cultural deposits. Archaeologists have divided the site into 11 layers, Archaeological Horizons I-XI. Excavations have unveiled red-painted plaster floors and mudbrick walls. 10 clay animal figurines were excavated at the site. The excavations at Chogha Golan have recently been renewed by an Iranian team led by Hojjat Darabi.

=== Archaeobotany ===
Domestication of cereals in the Near-East, including Chogha Golan

With more than 100,000 analyzed charred botanical items, the high density of seed and chaff remains at Chogha Golan is notable when compared to contemporary sites and even later, Bronze Age sites. 110 different species of plants have been discovered at Chogha Golan. The plant assemblage is dominated by specimens from the Poaceae and Fabaceae families: wild barley, Aegilops, lentil, Lathyrus, Pisum and Vicia. In addition to domesticated emmer wheat, the wild varieties of several Neolithic founder crops were discovered at the site: barley, lentil and pea.

Wild barley was found at every layer at Chogha Golan, starting with Archaeological Horizon XI. Before the appearance of domesticated emmer wheat, wild barley was the predominant cereal found at Chogha Golan, while wheat was rarely found. After around 2000 years, domesticated emmer first appears at Archaeological Horizon II and is also found in Archaeological Horizon I. After the initial appearance of domesticated emmer wheat, it became the predominant cereal grain found at the site.

=== Fauna ===
The faunal assemblage at Chogha Golan is dominated by ungulates (mostly sheep/goat but also gazelle, red deer, pig, and cattle), followed by fish. The remains of tortoise, hedgehog, red fox, and Eurasian lynx are also found.
