= Netiv HaGdud (archaeological site) =

Neolithic archaeological site in the West Bank

Netiv HaGdud is a Neolithic archaeological site in the West Bank. It was discovered in the 1970s during the construction of an Israeli settlement and excavated by Ofer Bar-Yosef in the 1980s.
