= List of Neolithic settlements =

This is a list of human Neolithic settlements sorted in chronological order.

| Name | Location | Culture | Period | Comment | Ref |
|---|---|---|---|---|---|
| Tell Abu Hureyra | Mesopotamia | Natufian culture | c. 11,000 BCE – 7,500 BCE | | |
| Tell Qaramel | Syria, Levant | Pre-Pottery Neolithic A | c. 10,890 – 8,780 BCE | Preceded by the Epipaleolithic Natufian settlement. | |
| El Khiam | Jordan Valley, Levant | Khiamian | c. 10,200 – 8,800 BCE | | |
| Mureybet | Mesopotamia | Khiamian Mureybetian Pre-Pottery Neolithic B | c. 10,200 – 9,700 BCE c. 9,700 – 9,300 BCE c. 9,300 – 8,600 BCE c. 8,600 – 8,000 BCE | Previously occupied by the Natufian culture. | |
| Iraq ed-Dubb | Jordan Valley, Levant | Pre-Pottery Neolithic | c. 10,000 – 7,950 BCE | | |
| Nanzhuangtou | North China Plain | | c. 9,500 – 7,500 BCE | | |
| Jericho | Jordan Valley, Levant | Sultanian Pre-Pottery Neolithic B Lodian culture | c. 9,500 – 7,370 BCE c. 6,800 – 5,850 BCE c. 5,850 – 4,500 BCE | Preceded by a Natufian settlement and continuously settled by a succession of cultures. | |
| Lepenski Vir | Donji Milanovac, Serbia | | c. 9,500 – 6,000 BCE | | |
| Göbekli Tepe | Anatolia | Pre-Pottery Neolithic | c. 9,130 – 7,370 BCE | | |
| Byblos | Mount Lebanon, Levant | Pre-Pottery Neolithic B Yarmukian culture Wadi Raba culture | c. 8,800 – 7,000 BCE c. 6,400 – 5,800 BCE c. 5,800 – 5,300 BCE c. 5,300 – 4,500 BCE | Continuously inhabited by a succession of cultures. | |
| Tell Aswad | Syria, Levant | Aswadian Pre-Pottery Neolithic B | c. 8700 – 7500 BCE | | |
| Nachcharini | Anti-Lebanon Mountains, Levant | Khiamian | c. 8,500 – 7,700 BCE | | |
| Nevalı Çori | Mesopotamia | Pre-Pottery Neolithic B | c. 8,400 – 8,100 BCE | | |
| 'Ain Ghazal | Jordan Valley, Levant | Pre-Pottery Neolithic B Yarmukian culture | c. 8,300 – 6,400 BCE c. 6,400 – 5,000 BCE | | |
| Çatalhöyük | Anatolia | Anatolian Neolithic | c. 7,100 – 5,700 BCE | | |
| Çayönü | Mesopotamia | Pre-Pottery Neolithic B | c. 8,630 – 6,800 BCE | | |
| Munhata | Jordan Valley, Levant | Pre-Pottery Neolithic B Yarmukian culture | c. 8,300 – 6,400 BCE c. 6,400 – 6,000 BCE | | |
| 'Ain Ghazal | Jordan Valley, Levant | Pre-Pottery Neolithic B | c. 8,300 – 5,000 BCE | | |
| Aşıklı Höyük | Anatolia | Pre-Pottery Neolithic | c. 8,200 – 7,400 BCE | | |
| Ganj Dareh | Zagros Mountains | | c. 8,000 – 5,500 BCE | | |
| Tell Halula | Mesopotamia | Pre-Pottery Neolithic B | c. 7,750 – 6,780 BCE | | |
| Tell Sabi Abyad | Mesopotamia | Pre-Pottery Neolithic B Hassuna culture Halaf culture Halaf-Ubaid culture Ubaid culture | c. 7,750 – 6,850 BCE c. 6,850 – 6,200 BCE c. 6,200 – 5,200 BCE c. 5,200 – 5,000 BCE c. 5,000 – 4,000 BCE | Continued settlement from the Uruk period into the Middle Assyrian Empire. | |
| Jarmo | Mesopotamia | Pottery Neolithic | c. 7,500 – 5,000 BCE | | |
| Pengtoushan | Yangtze valley, China | Pengtoushan culture | c. 7,500 – 6100 BCE | | |
| Nabta Playa | Nubian Desert | | c. 7,500 – 3,600 BCE | | |
| Chogha Bonut | Zagros Mountains | | c. 7,200 – 4,000 BCE | | |
| Jhusi | Ganges Valley, South Asia | | c. 7,106 – 7,080 BCE | | |
| Hacilar | Anatolia | Halaf culture | c. 7,040 – 5,000 BCE | | |
| Jiahu | Yellow River Valley, China | Peiligang culture | c. 7,000 – 5,700 BCE | | |
| Mehrgarh | Indus River Valley, South Asia | Neolithic South Asia | c. 7,000 – 5,500 BCE c. 5,500 – 4,800 BCE | Later developed into a Chalcolithic society (c. 4,800 – 2,600 BCE) | |
| Khirokitia | Cyprus | | c. 7,000 – 6,000 BCE | | |
| Knossos | Crete | Prehistoric Crete | c. 7,000 – 3,500 BCE | Developed into a major city-state of the Minoan civilization. | |
| Sesklo | Thessaly | Neolithic Greece | c. 6,850 – 4,400 BCE | | |
| Nea Nikomedeia | Macedonia | Neolithic Greece | c. 6,650 – 5,530 BCE | | |
| Shandong | North China Plain | Houli culture Beixin culture Dawenkou culture Longshan culture Yueshi culture | c. 6,500 – 5,500 BCE c. 5,300 – 4,100 BCE c. 4,100 – 2,600 BCE c. 3,000 – 1,900 BCE c. 1,900 – 1,500 BCE | Continuous settlement by successive cultures. | |
| Cishan | Taihang Mountains, China | Cishan culture | c. 6,500 – 5,000 BCE | | |
| Sha'ar HaGolan | Jordan Valley, Levant | Yarmukian culture | c. 6,400 – 6,000 BCE | | |
| Tel Kabri | Galilee, Israel | Yarmukian culture Wadi Raba culture | c. 6,400 – 5,800 BCE c. 5,800 – 4,500 BCE | Continued settlement by successive cultures. | |
| Starčevo | Danube Valley, Serbia | Starčevo culture | c. 6,200 – 4,500 BCE | | |
| Xinglonggou | Liao River | Xinglongwa culture Hongshan culture | c. 6,000 – 5,500 BCE c. 3,500 – 3,000 BCE | Settlement continued into the Bronze Age by the Lower Xiajiadian culture. | |
| Tell Hassuna | Nineveh, Mesopotamia | Hassuna culture | c. 6,000 – 5,350 BCE | | |
| Kuahuqiao | Qiantang River, China | Kuahuqiao culture | c. 6,000 – 5,000 BCE | | |
| Tell Shemshara | Nineveh, Mesopotamia | Hassuna culture | c. 6,000 – 4,000 BCE | Continued settlement by successive cultures. | |
| Tell Judaidah | Amik Valley, Anatolia | | c. 6,000 — 3,500 BCE | | |
| Brú na Bóinne | River Boyne, Eire | Boyne culture | c. 6,000 — 2,900 BCE | | |
| Vučedol | Vukovar, Croatia | | c. 6,000 – 2,300 BCE | | |
| Lin | Korçë, Albania | | c. 5,900 – 5,800 BCE | | |
| Hamadia | Beit She'an Valley, Israel | Yarmukian culture | c. 5,800 – 5,400 BCE | | |
| Dadiwan | Wei River Valley, China | Dadiwan culture | c. 5,800 – 5,400 BCE | | |
| Vinča-Belo Brdo | Vinča, Serbia | Vinča culture | c. 5,700 – 4,500 BCE | | |
| Xinle | Liao River, China | Xinle culture | c. 5,500 – 4,800 BCE | | |
| El Badari | Upper Egypt, Nile Valley | Badarian culture | c. 5,500 – 4,000 BCE | | |
| Tell Zeidan | Syria, Levant | Ubaid culture | c. 5,500 – 4,000 BCE | | |
| Hemudu | Hangzhou Bay | Hemudu culture | c. 5,500 – 3,300 BCE | | |
| Zhaobaogou | Luan River, China | Zhaobaogou culture | c. 5,400 – 4,500 BCE | | |
| Sotira | Cyprus | | c. 5,250 – 4,000 BCE | | |
| Mogylna | Danube Valley | Cucuteni–Trypillia culture | c. 5,000 — 4,600 BCE | | |
| Dimini | Thessaly | Neolithic Greece | c. 5,000 — 4,400 BCE | | |
| Daxi | Yangtze River Valley, China | Daxi culture | c. 5,000 — 3,300 BCE | | |
| Majiabang | Yangtze River Valley, China | Majiabang culture | c. 5,000 — 3,300 BCE | | |
| Skorba | Mġarr, Malta | Għar Dalam culture Skorba culture Żebbuġ culture Mġarr culture | c. 4,850 — 4,500 BCE c. 4,500 — 4,100 BCE c. 4,100 — 3,800 BCE c. 3,800 — 3,600 BCE | Continued settlement by Ġgantija and Tarxien cultures. | |
| Banpo | Yellow River Valley | Yangshao culture | c. 4,700 — 3,600 BCE | | |
| Vesioly Kut | Danube Valley | Cucuteni–Trypillia culture | c. 4,300 — 4,000 BCE | | |
| Nebelivka | Danube Valley | Cucuteni–Trypillia culture | c. 4,300 — 4,000 BCE | | |
| Trypillia | Danube Valley | Cucuteni–Trypillia culture | c. 4,300 — 4,000 BCE | | |
| Myropillya | Danube Valley | Cucuteni–Trypillia culture | c. 4,300 — 4,000 BCE | | |
| Kharkivka | Danube Valley | Cucuteni–Trypillia culture | c. 4,300 — 4,000 BCE | | |
| Glubochek | Danube Valley | Cucuteni–Trypillia culture | c. 4,300 — 4,000 BCE | | |
| Pianeshkove | Danube Valley | Cucuteni–Trypillia culture | c. 4,300 — 4,000 BCE | | |
| Vil’khovets | Danube Valley | Cucuteni–Trypillia culture | c. 4,300 — 4,000 BCE | | |
| Fedorovka | Danube Valley | Cucuteni–Trypillia culture | c. 4,300 — 4,000 BCE | | |
| Tomashovka | Danube Valley | Cucuteni–Trypillia culture | c. 4,000 — 3,600 BCE | | |
| Maidanetske | Danube Valley | Cucuteni–Trypillia culture | c. 4,000 — 3,600 BCE | | |
| Dobrovody | Danube Valley | Cucuteni–Trypillia culture | c. 4,000 — 3,600 BCE | | |
| Talianki | Danube Valley | Cucuteni–Trypillia culture | c. 4,000 — 3,600 BCE | | |
| Khrystynivka | Danube Valley | Cucuteni–Trypillia culture | c. 4,000 — 3,600 BCE | | |
| Volodymyrivka | Danube Valley | Cucuteni–Trypillia culture | c. 4,000 — 3,600 BCE | | |
| Peregonivka | Danube Valley | Cucuteni–Trypillia culture | c. 4,000 — 3,600 BCE | | |
| Vladyslavcyk | Danube Valley | Cucuteni–Trypillia culture | c. 4,000 — 3,600 BCE | | |
| Songze | Lake Tai, China | Songze culture | c. 3,800 — 3,300 BCE | | |
| Chychyrkozivka | Danube Valley | Cucuteni–Trypillia culture | c. 3,600 — 3,200 BCE | | |
| Kvitky | Danube Valley | Cucuteni–Trypillia culture | c. 3,600 — 3,200 BCE | | |
| Ksaverove | Danube Valley | Cucuteni–Trypillia culture | c. 3,600 — 3,200 BCE | | |
| Yaltushkiv | Danube Valley | Cucuteni–Trypillia culture | c. 3,600 — 3,200 BCE | | |
| Sushkivka | Danube Valley | Cucuteni–Trypillia culture | c. 3,600 — 3,200 BCE | | |
| Stina | Danube Valley | Cucuteni–Trypillia culture | c. 3,600 — 3,200 BCE | | |
| Romanivka | Danube Valley | Cucuteni–Trypillia culture | c. 3,600 — 3,200 BCE | | |
| Rozsokhuvatka | Danube Valley | Cucuteni–Trypillia culture | c. 3,600 — 3,200 BCE | | |
| Apolyanka | Danube Valley | Cucuteni–Trypillia culture | c. 3,600 — 2,700 BCE | | |
| Knap of Howar | Papa Westray, Orkney | Neolithic Orkney | c. 3,700 — 2,800 BCE | | |
| Ħaġar Qim | Qrendi, Malta | Ġgantija culture | c. 3,700 — 3,200 BCE | | |
| Ġgantija | Gozo, Malta | Ġgantija culture | c. 3,600 — 3,200 BCE | | |
| Mnajdra | Qrendi, Malta | Ġgantija culture | c. 3,600 — 3,200 BCE | | |
| Ta' Ħaġrat | Mġarr, Malta | Ġgantija culture Saflieni culture | c. 3,600 — 3,200 BCE c. 3,300 — 3,000 BCE | | |
| Qujialing | Yangtze River Valley | Qujialing culture | c. 3,400 — 2,600 BCE | | |
| Liangzhu | Yangtze Delta, China | Liangzhu culture | c. 3,400 — 2,250 BCE | | |
| Büdelsdorf | Schleswig-Holstein, Germany | Funnel Beaker Culture | c. 3,300 — 2,800 BCE | | |
| Oldenburg | Schleswig-Holstein, Germany | Funnel Beaker Culture | c. 3,300 — 2,800 BCE | | |
| Majiayao | Yellow River Valley, China | Majiayao culture Banshan culture Machang culture | c. 3,300 – 2,500 BCE c. 2,500 – 2,300 BCE c. 2,300 – 2,000 BCE | | |
| Ness of Brodgar | Orkney | Neolithic Orkney | c. 3,300 – 2,200 BCE | | |
| Tarxien | Malta | Tarxien culture | c. 3,250 – 2,800 BCE | | |
| Kocherzhyntsi | Danube Valley | Cucuteni–Trypillia culture | c. 3,200 — 2,700 BCE | | |
| Kosenivka | Danube Valley | Cucuteni–Trypillia culture | c. 3,200 — 2,700 BCE | | |
| Skara Brae | Bay of Skaill, Orkney | Neolithic Orkney | c. 3,180 — 2,500 BCE | | |
| Baodun | Chengdu Plain, Sichuan Basin, China | Baodun culture | c. 2,700 — 1,700 BCE | | |
| Shijiahe | Yangtze River Valley, China | Shijiahe culture | c. 2,500 — 2,000 BCE | | |

== See also ==
- Copper Age state societies
- Neolithic Revolution
- List of Mesolithic settlements
