= List of Mesolithic settlements =

List of Mesolithic and Epipaleolithic settlements.

== Mesolithic Europe ==
Name	Location	Culture	Period	Comment
Franchthi Cave	Argolis, Balkans		c. 15,000 – 9,000 BP	Previously inhabited during the Upper Paleolithic, continuously inhabited into the Neolithic.
Pulli settlement	Pärnu, Baltics	Kunda culture	c. 10,800 – 7,800 BP	
Lepenski Vir	Serbia, Balkans	Iron Gates culture	c. 11,500 - 8,000 BP	
Star Carr	North Yorkshire, Britain		c. 11,300 - 10,480 BP	
Howick house	Northumberland, Britain		c. 9,600 - 9,500 BP	

== Epipaleolithic Near East ==
Name	Location	Culture	Period	Comment	Ref
Tell Qaramel	Queiq, Levant	Natufian	c. 18,890 - 12,980 BP		
Aammiq	Beqaa Valley, Levant	Natufian	c. 14,000 – 12,200 BP	Later occupied during the Ubaid period.	
Tell Abu Hureyra	Mesopotamia	Natufian	c. 13,500 – 11,500 BP		
Beidha	Jordan Valley, Levant	Natufian	c. 13,000 – 12,000 BP		
Mureybet	Mesopotamia	Natufian	c. 12,200 – 11,700 BP	(Phase IA) Later occupied by the Khiamian and Mureybetian cultures.	
Hatula	Judean Hills, Levant	Natufian	c. 12,150 – 11,320 BP	Later inhabited by the Khiamian and Sultanian cultures.	
Jericho	Jordan Valley, Levant	Natufian	c. 12,000 – 11,500 BP	Succeeded by the Pre-Pottery Neolithic settlement.	
ʿAin Mallaha	Hula Valley, Levant	Natufian	c. 12,000 – 10,000 BP		

== See also ==
- List of Neolithic settlements
