= ASPRO chronology =

Dating system of the ancient Near East used for archaeological sites

The ASPRO chronology is a nine-period dating system of the ancient Near East used by the Maison de l'Orient et de la Méditerranée for archaeological sites aged between 14,000 and 5,700 BP.

First published in 1994, ASPRO stands for the "Atlas des sites du Proche-Orient" (Atlas of Near East archaeological sites), a French publication pioneered by Francis Hours and developed by other scholars such as Olivier Aurenche.

The periods, cultures, features and date ranges of the original ASPRO chronology are shown below:

ASPRO Period	Cultural phases	Dates
Period 1	Natufian, Zarzian final	12,000 – 10,300 BP or 12,000 – 10,200 cal. BCE
Period 2	Protoneolithic, Pre-Pottery Neolithic A (PPNA), Khiamian, Sultanian, Harifian	10,300 – 9,600 BP or 10,200 – 8,800 cal. BCE
Period 3	Pre-Pottery Neolithic B (PPNB, PPNB ancien)	9,600 – 8,000 BP or 8,800 – 7,600 cal. BCE
Period 4	Pre-Pottery Neolithic B (PPNB, PPNB moyen)	8,600 – 8,000 BP or 7,600 – 6,900 cal. BCE
Period 5	Dark Faced Burnished Ware (DFBW), Çatalhöyük, Umm Dabaghiyah-Sotto, Proto-Hassuna, Ubaid 0	8,600 – 7,600 BP or 6,900 – 6,400 cal. BCE
Period 6	Hassuna, Samarra, Halaf, Ubaid 1	7,600 – 7,000 BP or 6,400 – 5,800 cal. BCE
Period 7	Pottery Neolithic A (PNA), Halaf final, Ubaid 2	7,000 – 6,500 BP or 5,800 – 5,400 cal. BCE
Period 8	Pottery Neolithic B (PNB), Ubaid 3	6,500 – 6,100 BP or 5,400 – 5,000 cal. BCE
Period 9	Ubaid 4	6,100 – 5,700 BP or 5,000 – 4,500 cal. BCE

In 2001, the institute revised the chronology of the first six periods based on newer carbon data and calibration curves. In Period 3 an early and late phase could be distinguished, but Periods 4 and 5 were merged. Overall they found more overlap in time between different cultural phases between different sites.

ASPRO Period	Cultural phases	Dates BP	Dates BCE
Period 1	Natufian, Zarzian final	12,000 – 10,300 BP	12,500 – 9,500 cal. BCE
Period 2	Protoneolithic, Pre-Pottery Neolithic A (PPNA)	10,300 – 9,600 BP	10,500 – 8,300 cal. BCE
Period 3	early Pre-Pottery Neolithic B (PPNB ancient)	9,600 – .... BP	9,200 – 8,300 cal. BCE
Period 3	middle Pre-Pottery Neolithic B (PPNB moyen)	.... – 8,000 BP	8,400 – 7,500 cal. BCE
Period 4,5	middle to late Pre-Pottery Neolithic B (PPNB moyen, PPNC)	8,600 – 7,600 BP	7,600 – 6,000 cal. BCE
Period 6	Hassuna, Samarra, Halaf, Ubaid 1	7,600 – 7,000 BP	6,400 – 5,600 cal. BCE

== See also ==
- Ancient Near East
- Neolithic
