= Abu Madi =

Archaeological site in Egypt

- Location within Egypt
- 28.5555°N 33.9762°E
- Type: Cluster of Tells
- Periods: Khiamian, PPNA
- Cultures: Khiamian, Abu Madi Entity
- Location: near Saint Catherine's Monastery, Egypt
- Region: Sinai
- Part of: Settlements

History
- Built: c. 10100 BP
- Abandoned: c. 9700 BP

Site notes
- Material: Granite
- Length: 20 metres (66 ft) (Abu Madi III)
- Width: 20 metres (66 ft) (Abu Madi III)
- Area: 0.008 hectares (860 ft^{2}) (Abu Madi I)
- Excavation dates: 1980–
- Archaeologists: Ofer Bar-Yosef
- Condition: Ruins
- Public access: Yes

Abu Madi (Arabic:أبو ماضي) is a cluster of prehistoric, Neolithic tell mounds in Southern Sinai, Egypt. It is located east of Saint Catherine's Monastery at the bottom of a granite ridge. It was suggested to have been a seasonal encampment for groups of hunter gatherers and contained the remains of two major settlements; Abu Madi I and Abu Madi III. Abi Madi I is a small site with the remains of a partially buried 4 metres (13 ft) building containing deposits up to a depth of 1.3 metres (4.3 ft). Abu Madi III was an area of roughly 20 square metres (220 ft^{2}) that was excavated close to a large nearby boulder. Dwellings were found to have stone built silos next to them. It was first excavated in the early 1980s by Ofer Bar-Yosef.

== Culture ==
The culture has been referred to as the Abu Madi Entity as it shows evidence of having retained Natufian characteristics of a temporary settlement, while being at least partly contemporary with the PPNA cultures of the Levant further to the North. It has been dated approximately 10100 to 9700 BP or from between 9660 to 9180 BC with calibrated datings ranging between c. 9750 and 7760 BC. Judging by these radiocarbon dates, Abu Madi has been suggested to be a form of late Khiamian culture. It has been suggested that the dwellings found housed small groups of nuclear families continuing in the Natufian style. A large number of chipped flints were recovered including a new type of aerodynamic arrowhead known as the Abu Madi Point characterised by elongated ovals or rhomboid shapes, occasionally with a small tang. El Khiam points were also found with deep concave bases and it has been suggested these arrowheads were used to hunt such animals as gazelles and wild ibexes. Abu Madi has been suggested to be amongst the ten probable centers for the origin of agriculture and used in statistical analysis to determine the rate of spread into Europe.

== Literature ==
- Bar-Yosef, Ofer., Neolithic Sites in Sinai, Frey and Uerpmann 1981, Beiträge zur Umweltgeschichte des Vorderen Orients, Tübinger Atlas des Vorderen Orients (TAVO) A 8, Wiesbaden, pp. 217–235, 19 pages, 1981.
- Gopher, Avi., Flint tool industries of the Neolithic period in Israel, PhD thesis, Hebrew University Jerusalem, 389 pages, 1985.
- Kuijt, I. Bar-Yosef, O., Radiocarbon Chronology for the Levantine Neolithic: Observations and Data, Radiocarbon, 36, 227–245, 1994.
- Gopher, A., Arrowheads of the Neolithic Levant. A Seriation Analysis, PhD thesis. American Schools of Oriental Research. Dissertation Series 10, 1994.
