= Nizzanim culture =

Late Neolithic archaeological culture of the Southern Levant

- Late Neolithic cultures in the Southern Levant: Yarmukian; Lodian; Nizzanim
- Geographical range: Southern Levant
- Period: Late Neolithic
- Preceded by: Khiamian
- Followed by: Wadi Rabah

The Nizzanim culture is a suggested archaeological culture from the Pottery Neolithic of the Southern Levant. It was identified in three sites spread over a small area on the southern coastal plain of modern Israel, including the type site of Nizzanim, Giv'at Haparsa, and Ziqim. The sites were studied by Ya'aqov Olami (1906–1990), Felix Burian (1924–2017) together with Erich Friedman, Shmuel Yeivin (1896–1982), and Yosef Garfinkel (b. 1956). At those sites, there were no architectural remains but pits and floor levels with hearths. These findings seem to represent a pastoral-nomadic population, similar to the preceding population of Pre-Pottery Neolithic Ashkelon and the Qatifian culture. Garfinkel suggests that these settlement served as seasonal hunting or fishing campsites.

== Name and location ==
The type-site is named after the nearby Kibbutz Nitzanim, built in an area of coastal dunes. Kibbutz Zikim is further down the coast from Nitzanim. Giv'at Haparsa is a site right next to the beach, between Yavne-Yam and Ashdod. The different spelling between the names of modern towns and the corresponding archaeological sites is a common occurrence in Israeli archaeology.

== Controversy ==
=== Existence ===
While Garfinkel suggests that the Nizzanim culture coexisted with the Yarmukian and Lodian cultures, Avi Gopher and Ram Gophna reject the sites as a distinct culture and consider their artifacts to represent a variant of the Lodian culture.

=== Dating ===
The dating of the Nizzanim culture is unclear mainly because no stratigraphic relations with different periods have been observed. In Garfinkel's opinion, it was contemporary with the Yarmukian and Lodian cultures. Only one proper radiocarbon date from the sites is available (5767–5541 BCE), but dates one of the sites to the time of the Wadi Raba culture (post-dating the Yarmukian and Lodian). This date contradicts the archaeological findings, and most archaeologists agree that they represent the Pottery Neolithic (c. 6400 - 5800 BCE).

== Artifacts ==
The pottery of the Nizzanim culture is characterized by simple and rough designs with very little decorations. This type of pottery is considered very simple in comparison to other Neolithic pottery assemblages, including those of the nearby Yarmukian and Lodian cultures.

The flint tool types are similar to the types of the preceding Pre-Pottery Neolithic tools, with a large number of arrowheads, sickle blades, and hole punchers, while hand axes are relatively scarce.
