= Tell Halula =

Ancient tell in Syria

- Location within Near East Location within Syria
- 36.416667°N 38.166667°E
- Type: Tell
- Periods: PPNB, Neolithic
- Location: 105 km (65 mi) east of Aleppo, Syria
- Region: Euphrates
- Part of: Village

History
- Built: c. 7750
- Abandoned: c. 6780 BC

Site notes
- Material: bones, flints, pottery, plaster
- Length: 300 metres (980 ft)
- Width: 150 metres (490 ft)
- Area: 8 hectares (860,000 ft^{2})
- Excavation dates: 1991-
- Archaeologists: Miquel Molist
- Condition: Ruins
- Management: Directorate-General of Antiquities and Museums
- Public access: Yes

Tell Halula is a large, prehistoric, Neolithic tell, about 8 hectares (860,000 ft^{2}) in size, located around 105 kilometres (65 mi) east of Aleppo and 25 kilometres (16 mi) northwest of Manbij in the Raqqa Governorate of Syria.

== Excavation ==
The tell was first excavated in 1991 by the Spanish Archaeological Mission, directed by Miquel Molist, Professor of Prehistory at the Universitat Autònoma de Barcelona. Archaeological trenches have covered an area of approximately 2,500 square metres (27,000 ft^{2}).

== Construction ==
The large mound is located on the steppe of nearby mountains at an altitude of 349 metres (1,145 ft) above sea level and was found to be approximately 8 metres (26 ft) deep. It is situated between Wadi Fars and Wadi Abu Gal Gal on the right bank and fluvial plain of the Euphrates. It is one of the largest neolithic sites yet found, described as a megasite, including the remains of twenty one rectangular houses of three to five rooms, nine with associated burials of at least one hundred and seven incomplete skeletons. Burials were made under the floors of the houses, which were typically covered with a limestone plaster.

== Culture ==
Occupation of the site was detected from the middle of Pre-Pottery Neolithic B (PPNB) at around 7750 BC into the Neolithic around 6780 BC and has provided insight into the transitions during this period, especially the emergence of agriculture during the Neolithic Revolution. Forty levels of occupation have been detected with levels one to twenty dating to the middle PPNB; twenty-one to thirty-four dating to the late PPNB; and two later levels, thirty-six and thirty-seven, showing evidence of the Halaf culture. Various arrowheads were found which were largely classed as Byblos points. Several showed signs of lime plaster around the tangs, which has been suggested to have been the method of fixing to the arrow's shaft. Excavations revealed paintings of female figures on the floor of one of the buildings, which are suggested to be the oldest paintings of people in the Middle East.

=== Ceramics ===
The ceramic sequence in Halula begins early in the 7th millennium BC. The introduction of Halaf culture painted Fine Ware is documented for the ‘Halula Phase IV’ period; this took place at the end of 7th millennium. Prior to that, there was the ‘Pre-Halaf’ period covering a very long initial stage of pottery production; the excavators break down this long period as Halula Phases I to III.

== Agriculture and animal domestication ==
222 flint sickle blades were found, including the remains of a complete sickle found in one of the houses made of four blade elements fixed with bitumen, shaped in a curved edge approximately 30 cm in length. Archaeozoological analyses of bovine tooth enamel show the development of herding and management practices of cattle.

D. Helmer suggested that domestication of goats also occurred at this site during the middle PPNB, in a transition from hunting gazelles. Farming of sheep and cattle took place in late middle PPNB stages with a decrease in size of cow noted as a sign of domestication. The prevalence of wild animals also reduced over this period. Analysis of naked emmer wheat and spikelet bases has shown this crop to have been domesticated during the middle of PPNB period at this site. The bottom levels of the tell revealed no evidence of wild crops, which suggests that the first people to occupy the site brought with them fully domesticated forms of wheat, barley and flax, which had been domesticated elsewhere.

== Ancient DNA ==
Eva Fernández Domínguez extracted samples of mitochondrial DNA from human bones from Tell Halula as part of the studies for her PhD thesis accepted at the University of Barcelona in 2005. The methodology used was later superseded, so a first publication of the results in 2008 was corrected in a subsequent publication in 2014. In the latter publication the mtDNA haplogroups were given as U, R0, K, HV, H, N and L3.

== See also ==
- Tell Sabi Abyad
