= Hatula =

Archaeological site in Israel

- Location within Israel
- 31.825556°N 34.9875°E
- Type: semi-circular dwelling
- Periods: PPNA
- Cultures: Natufian, Khiamian
- Region: Israel

Site notes
- Excavation dates: 1981-1990
- Archaeologists: Monique Lechevallier, Avraham Ronen
- Condition: Ruins

Hatula is an early Neolithic archeological site in the Judean hills south of Latrun, beside Nahshon Stream, in Israel, 20 kilometres (12 mi) west of Jerusalem. The site is 15 metres (49 ft) above the riverbed on a rocky slope in an alluvial valley. Excavations revealed three levels of occupation in the Natufian, Khiamian and PPNA (Sultanian).

The site was excavated in eight seasons between 1981 and 1990 by Monique Lechevallier of the CNRS and Avraham Ronen from the University of Haifa. They unearthed a semi-circular dwelling with burial in the latest period. The site was suggested to have been a hunting station for flocks of gazelle. Radiocarbon dates for the site suggest habitation between 10150 and 9320 BC by semi-sedentary groups. Evidence suggested domesticated dogs were present at the site. Study of the lithic industry suggested the Khiamian was an adaptation of the Natufian in the area. Evidence of an accomplished bone industry were found but no signs of any grinding tools, art objects or building materials in the earliest two levels indicating a short term settlement pattern.

Archaeobotanical samples were taken from the Khiamian and Sultanian periods for phytolith analysis. This gave evidence of wheat at the site, along with an unidentified grass whose seeds were possibly a food source, both of which suggested that cereals may have been part of the Natufian economy in Hatula. Changes in morphology of cells from husks of the grasses suggest a larger seed content, possibly due to increased exploitation, in the Sultanian.
