= El Khiam =

Archeological site in Israel

- Location within Near East Location within the West Bank
- 31.633333°N 35.25°E
- Periods: Mesolithic, Neolithic
- Cultures: Khiamian
- Location: West Bank, Palestine

Site notes
- Excavation dates: 1931, 1957, 1961
- Archaeologists: R. Neuville, André Parrot, Joaquín González Echegaray
- Public access: Unknown

El Khiam (Arabic: الخیام) is an archaeological site near Wadi Khureitun in the Judaean Desert in the West Bank, on the shores of the Dead Sea.

Archaeological finds at El Khiam show nearly continuous habitation by groups of hunters since the Mesolithic and early Neolithic periods. The Khiamian period (c. 10000–9500 BCE), named for this site, is characterized by flint arrowheads now known as "El-Khiam points". El Khiam was first excavated by René Neuville in 1934, by Jean Perrot in 1951 and Joaquín González Echegaray in 1961.

== Gallery ==
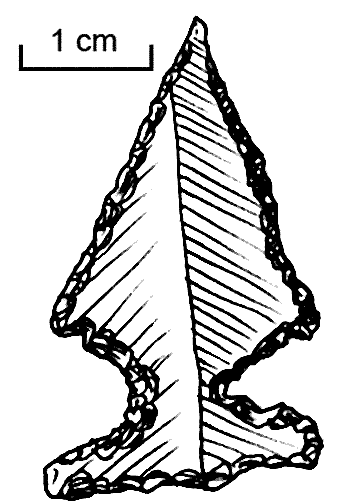
El-Khiam point microlith, first found at El Khiam.

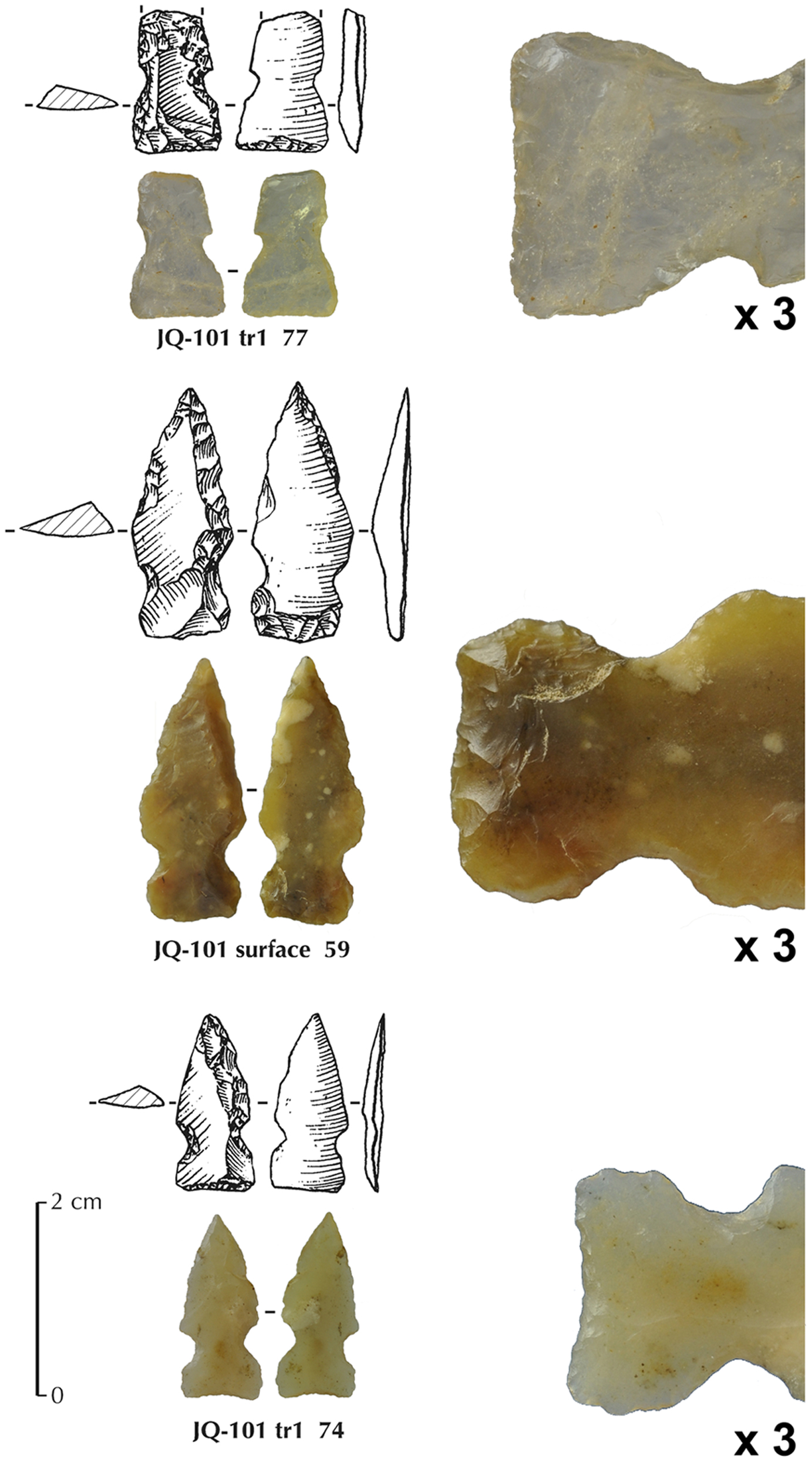
Three El-Khiam points.
