= Rozsokhuvatka =

Rozsokhuvatka, Ukraine, is the site of an ancient mega-settlement belonging to the Cucuteni–Trypillian culture dating to between 3600 and 3200 BC. The settlement was very large for the time, covering an area of 100 hectares (250 acres). This proto-city is just one of 2,440 Cucuteni–Trypillia settlements discovered so far in Moldova and Ukraine. Some 194 (8%) of these settlements had an area of more than 10 hectares between 5000–2700 BC and more than 29 settlements had an area in the range of 100–450 hectares.

== See also ==
- Cucuteni–Trypillia culture
- Danubian culture
