= Neolithic =

Archaeological period, last part of the Stone Age (New Stone Age)

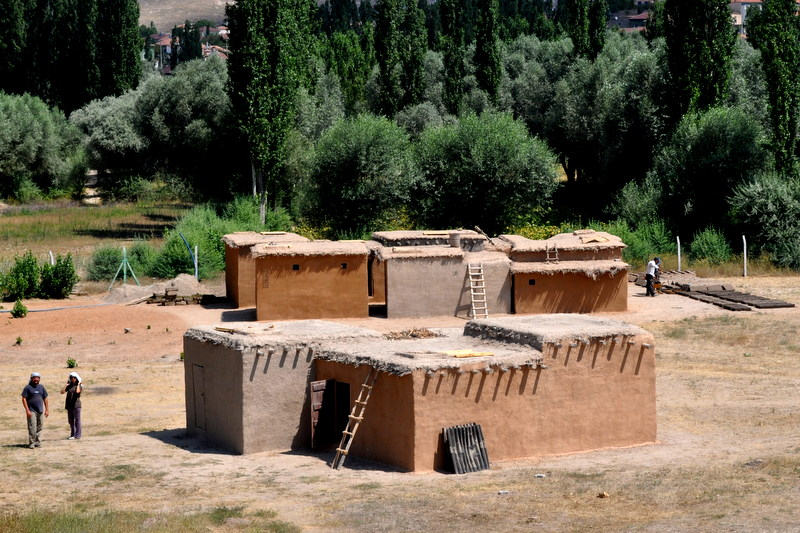
- Reconstruction of Pre-Pottery Neolithic B housing in Aşıklı Höyük, modern Turkey
- Period: Final period of Stone Age
- Dates: c. 10,000 BC to c. 2,000 BC
- Preceded by: Mesolithic, Epipalaeolithic
- Followed by: Chalcolithic

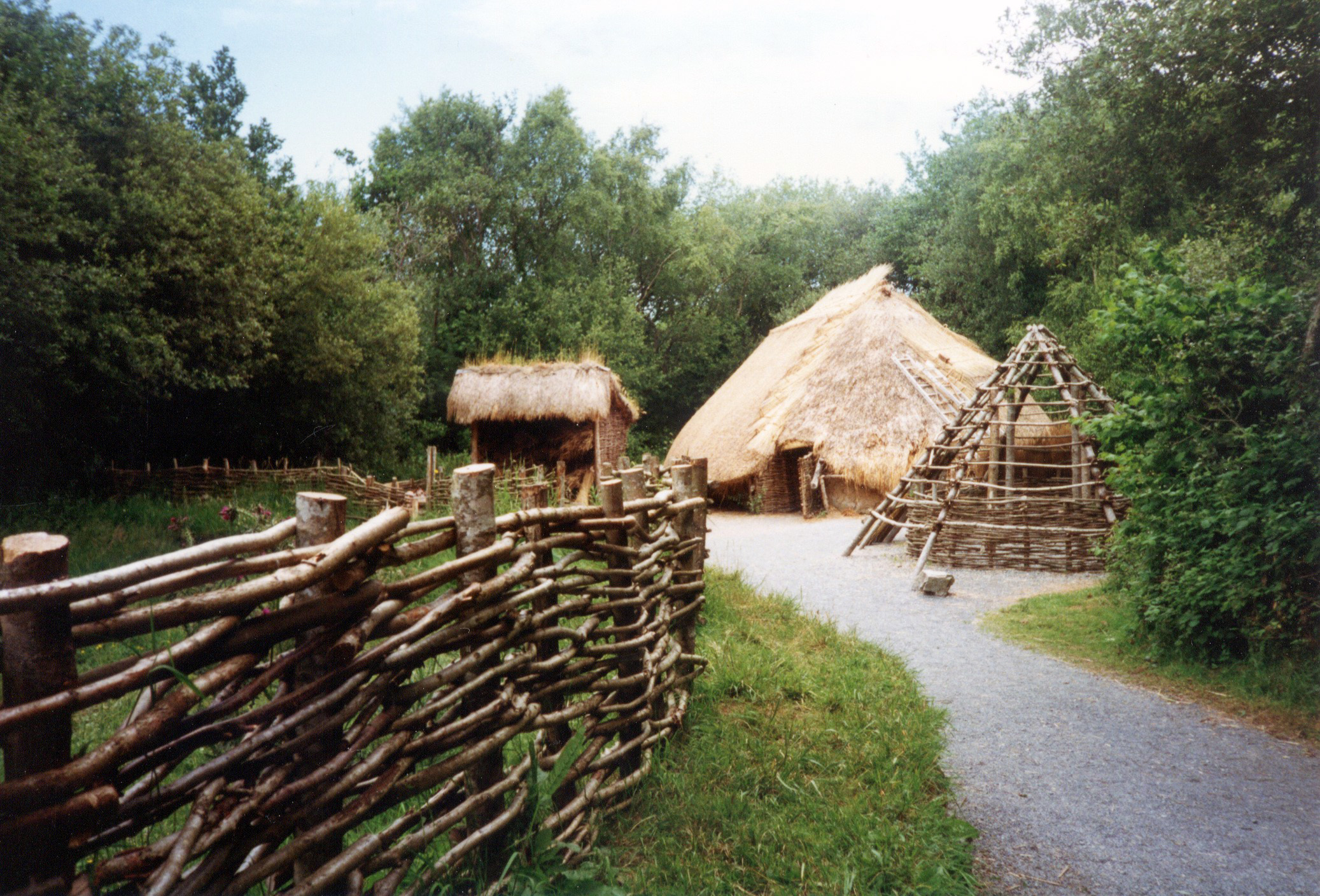
Reconstruction of a Neolithic farmstead, Irish National Heritage Park. The Neolithic saw the invention of agriculture.

The Neolithic (from Greek νέος néos 'new' and λίθος líthos 'stone'), or New Stone Age, is an archaeological period, the final division of the Stone Age in Asia, Europe and Africa (c. 10,000 BC to c. 2,000 BC). It saw the Neolithic Revolution, a wide-ranging set of developments that appear to have arisen independently in several parts of the world. This "Neolithic package" included the introduction of farming, domestication of animals, and change from a hunter-gatherer lifestyle to one of settlement. The term 'Neolithic' was coined by John Lubbock in 1865 as a refinement of the three-age system.

The Neolithic began about 12,000 years ago, when farming appeared in the Epipalaeolithic West Asia and Mesopotamia, and later in other parts of the world. It lasted in West Asia until the transitional period of the Chalcolithic (Copper Age) from about 6,500 years ago (4500 BC), marked by the development of metallurgy, leading up to the Bronze Age and Iron Age.

In other places, the Neolithic followed the Mesolithic (Middle Stone Age) and then lasted until later. In ancient Egypt, the Neolithic lasted until the Protodynastic period, c. 3150 BC. In China, it lasted until circa 2000 BC with the rise of the pre-Shang Erlitou culture, as it did in Scandinavia.

== Origin ==
Approximate centers of origin of agriculture in the Neolithic Revolution and its spread in prehistory: the Fertile Crescent (12,000 BP), the Yangtze river and Yellow River basins (9,000 BP) and the New Guinea Highlands (9,000–6,000 BP), Central Mexico (5,000–4,000 BP), Northern South America (5,000–4,000 BP), sub-Saharan Africa (5,000–4,000 BP, exact location unknown), eastern North America (4,000–3,000 BP).

Following the ASPRO chronology, the Neolithic started in around 10,200 BC in the Levant, arising from the Natufian culture, when pioneering use of wild cereals evolved into early farming. The Natufian period or "proto-Neolithic" lasted from 12,500 to 9,500 BC, and is taken to overlap with the Pre-Pottery Neolithic A (PPNA) of 10,200–8800 BC. As the Natufians had become dependent on wild cereals in their diet, and a sedentary way of life had begun among them, the climatic changes associated with the Younger Dryas (about 10,000 BC) are thought to have forced people to develop farming.

The founder crops of the Fertile Crescent were wheat, lentil, pea, chickpea, bitter vetch, and flax. Among the other major crops to be domesticated were rice and millet. Crops were usually domesticated in a single location and ancestral wild species are still found.

Early Neolithic age farming was limited to a narrow range of plants, both wild and domesticated, which included einkorn wheat, millet and spelt, and the keeping of dogs. By about 8000 BC, it included domesticated sheep and goats, cattle and pigs.

Not all of these cultural elements characteristic of the Neolithic appeared everywhere in the same order: the earliest farming societies in the West Asia did not use pottery. In other parts of the world, such as Africa, South Asia and Southeast Asia, independent domestication events led to their own regionally distinctive Neolithic cultures, which arose completely independently of those in Europe and Southwest Asia. Early Japanese societies and other East Asian cultures used pottery before developing agriculture.

== Periods by region ==
=== Near East (Western Asia) ===
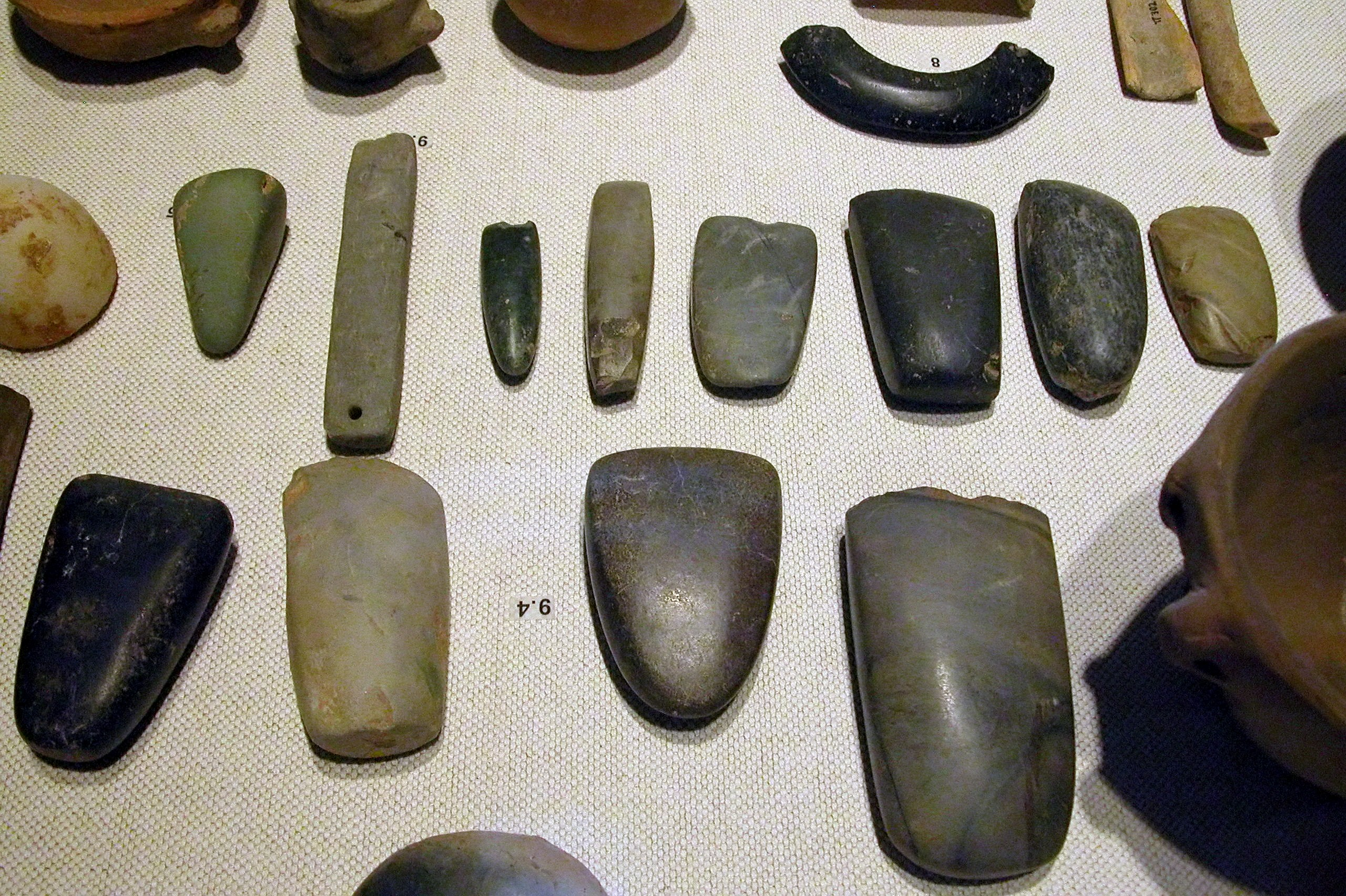
An array of Neolithic artifacts, including bracelets, axe heads, chisels, and polishing tools

In the Middle East, cultures identified as Neolithic began appearing in the 10th millennium BC. Early development occurred in the Levant (e.g. Pre-Pottery Neolithic A and Pre-Pottery Neolithic B) and from there spread eastwards and westwards. Neolithic cultures are also attested in southeastern Anatolia, northern Mesopotamia, and the Sinai Peninsula by around 8000 BC, reflecting the southward expansion of Pre-Pottery Neolithic traditions across the Levantine corridor.

Anatolian Neolithic farmers derived a significant portion of their ancestry from the Anatolian hunter-gatherers (AHG), suggesting that agriculture was adopted in site by these hunter-gatherers and not spread by demic diffusion into the region.

==== Pre-Pottery Neolithic A ====
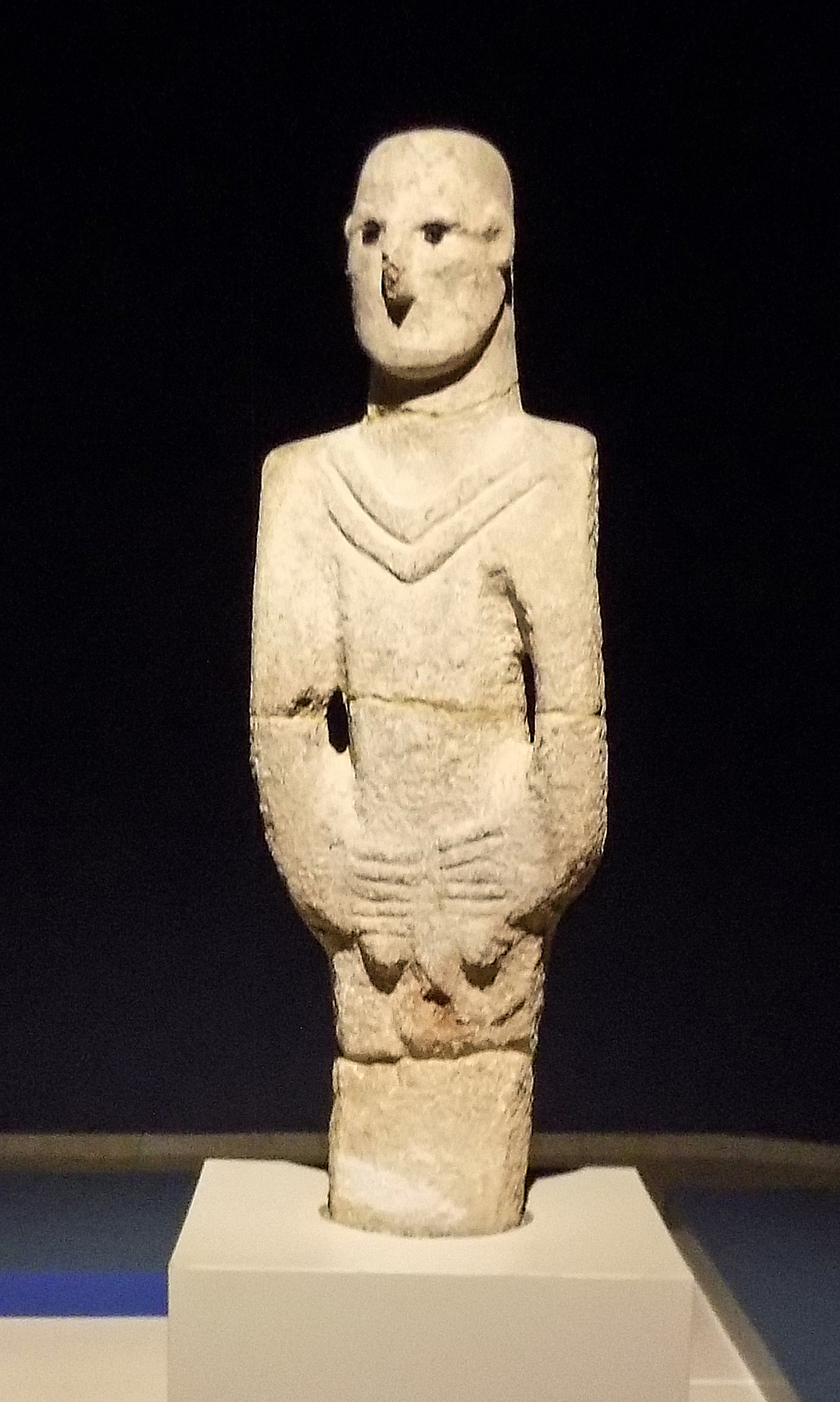
The Urfa Man c. 9000 BC. Şanlıurfa Archaeology and Mosaic Museum.

The Neolithic 1 (PPNA) period began around 10,000 BC in the Levant. A temple area in southeastern Turkey at Göbekli Tepe, dated to around 9500 BC, may be regarded as the beginning of the period. This site was developed by nomadic hunter-gatherer tribes, as shown by the absence of permanent housing nearby, and may be the oldest known human-made place of worship. At least seven stone circles, covering 25 acres (10 ha), contain limestone pillars carved with animals, insects, and birds. Stone tools were used by perhaps as many as hundreds of people to create the pillars, which might have supported roofs. Other early PPNA sites dating to around 9500–9000 BC have been found in Palestine, notably in Tell es-Sultan (ancient Jericho) and Gilgal in the Jordan Valley; Israel (notably Ain Mallaha, Nahal Oren, and Kfar HaHoresh); in Byblos, Lebanon; and in Sinai, including sites such as Abu Madi.

The major advance of Neolithic 1 was true farming. In the proto-Neolithic Natufian cultures, wild cereals were harvested, and perhaps early seed selection and re-seeding occurred. The grain was ground into flour. Emmer wheat was domesticated. In 2006, remains of figs were discovered in a house in Jericho dated to 9400 BC. The figs are of a mutant variety that cannot be pollinated by insects, and therefore the trees can only reproduce from cuttings. This evidence suggests that figs were the first cultivated crop and mark the invention of the technology of farming. This occurred centuries before the first cultivation of grains.

Settlements became more permanent, with circular houses, much like those of the Natufians, with single rooms. However, these houses were for the first time made of mudbrick. The settlement had a surrounding stone wall and perhaps a stone tower (as in Jericho). The wall served as protection from nearby groups, as protection from floods, or to keep animals penned. Some of the enclosures also suggest grain and meat storage.

==== Pre-Pottery Neolithic B ====
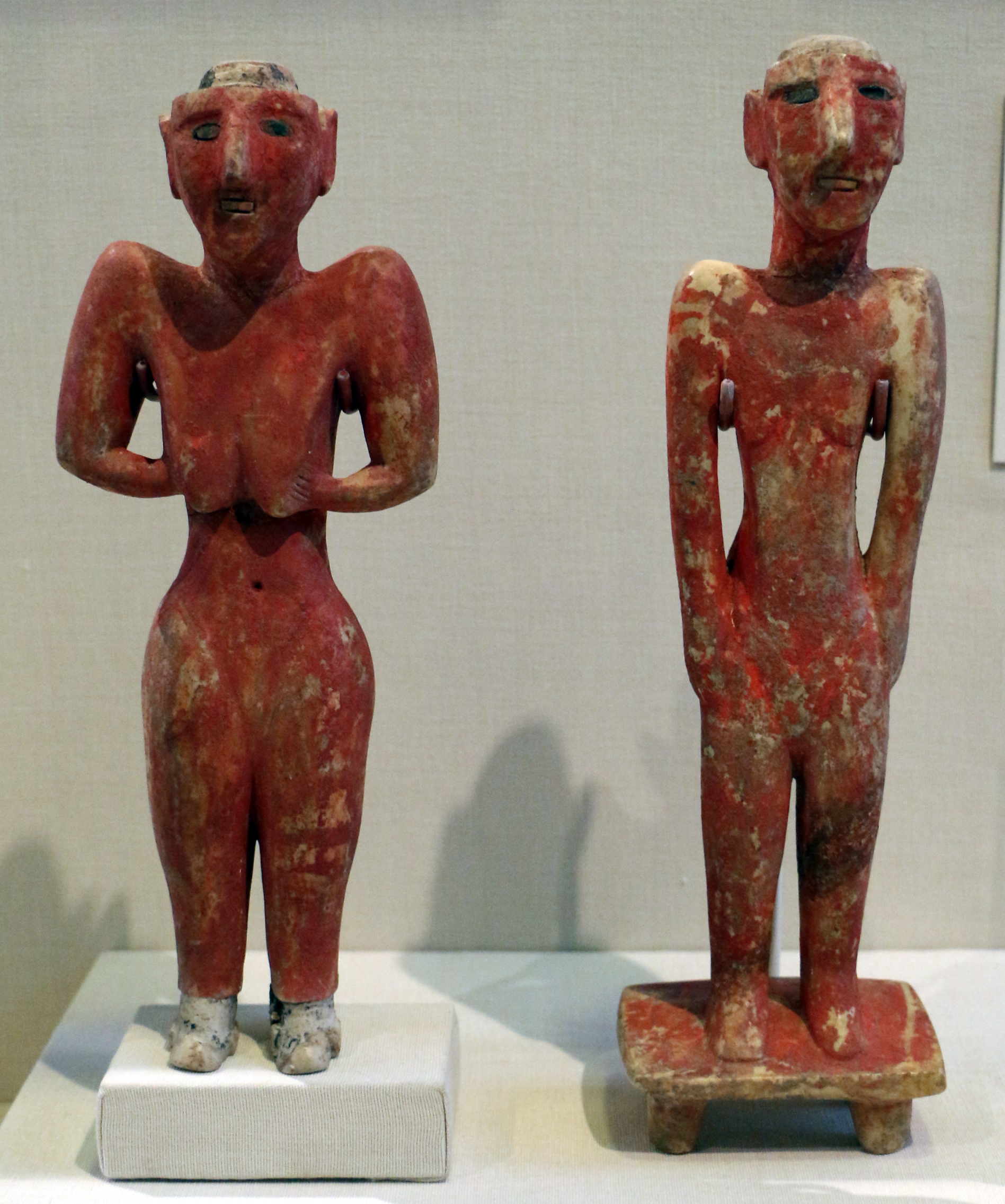
Female and male figurines; 9000–7000 BC; gypsum with bitumen and stone inlays; from Tell Fekheriye (Al-Hasakah Governorate of Syria); University of Chicago Oriental Institute (USA)

The Neolithic 2 (PPNB) began around 8800 BC according to the ASPRO chronology in the Levant (Jericho, West Bank). As with the PPNA dates, there are two versions from the same laboratories noted above. This system of terminology, however, is not convenient for southeast Anatolia and settlements of the middle Anatolia basin. Studies of the Pre-Pottery Neolithic B cultural complex indicate that its long-lived and widely distributed tradition extended across the Levant from the Taurus Mountains in the north to the Sinai in the south, reflecting its broad geographic scope during this phase. A settlement of 3,000 inhabitants called 'Ain Ghazal was found in the outskirts of Amman, Jordan. Considered to be one of the largest prehistoric settlements in the Near East, it was continuously inhabited from approximately 7250 BC to approximately 5000 BC. By early PPNB (10,500–10,000 cal. BP), regulation of ungulates had started, signaling the start of animal husbandry and selective breeding.

Settlements have rectangular mud-brick houses where the family lived together in single or multiple rooms. Burial findings suggest an ancestor cult where people preserved skulls of the dead, which were plastered with mud to make facial features. The rest of the corpse could have been left outside the settlement to decay until only the bones were left, then the bones were buried inside the settlement underneath the floor or between houses.

==== Pre-Pottery Neolithic C ====
Work at the site of 'Ain Ghazal in Jordan has indicated a later Pre-Pottery Neolithic C period. Juris Zarins has proposed that a Circum Arabian Nomadic Pastoral Complex developed in the period from the climatic crisis of 6200 BC, partly as a result of an increasing emphasis in PPNB cultures upon domesticated animals, and a fusion with Harifian hunter gatherers in the Southern Levant, with affiliate connections with the cultures of Fayyum and the Eastern Desert of Egypt. Cultures practicing this lifestyle spread down the Red Sea shoreline and moved east from Syria into southern Iraq.

==== Late Neolithic ====
The Late Neolithic began around 6,400 BC in the Fertile Crescent. By then distinctive cultures emerged, with pottery like the Halafian (Turkey, Syria, Northern Mesopotamia) and Ubaid (Southern Mesopotamia). This period has been further divided into PNA (Pottery Neolithic A) and PNB (Pottery Neolithic B) at some sites. In the southern Negev and Sinai deserts, the Late Neolithic is characterised by the pastoralist Timnian culture, which persisted into the Bronze Age.

The Chalcolithic (Stone-Bronze) period began about 4500 BC, then the Bronze Age began about 3500 BC, replacing the Neolithic cultures.

==== Fertile Crescent ====
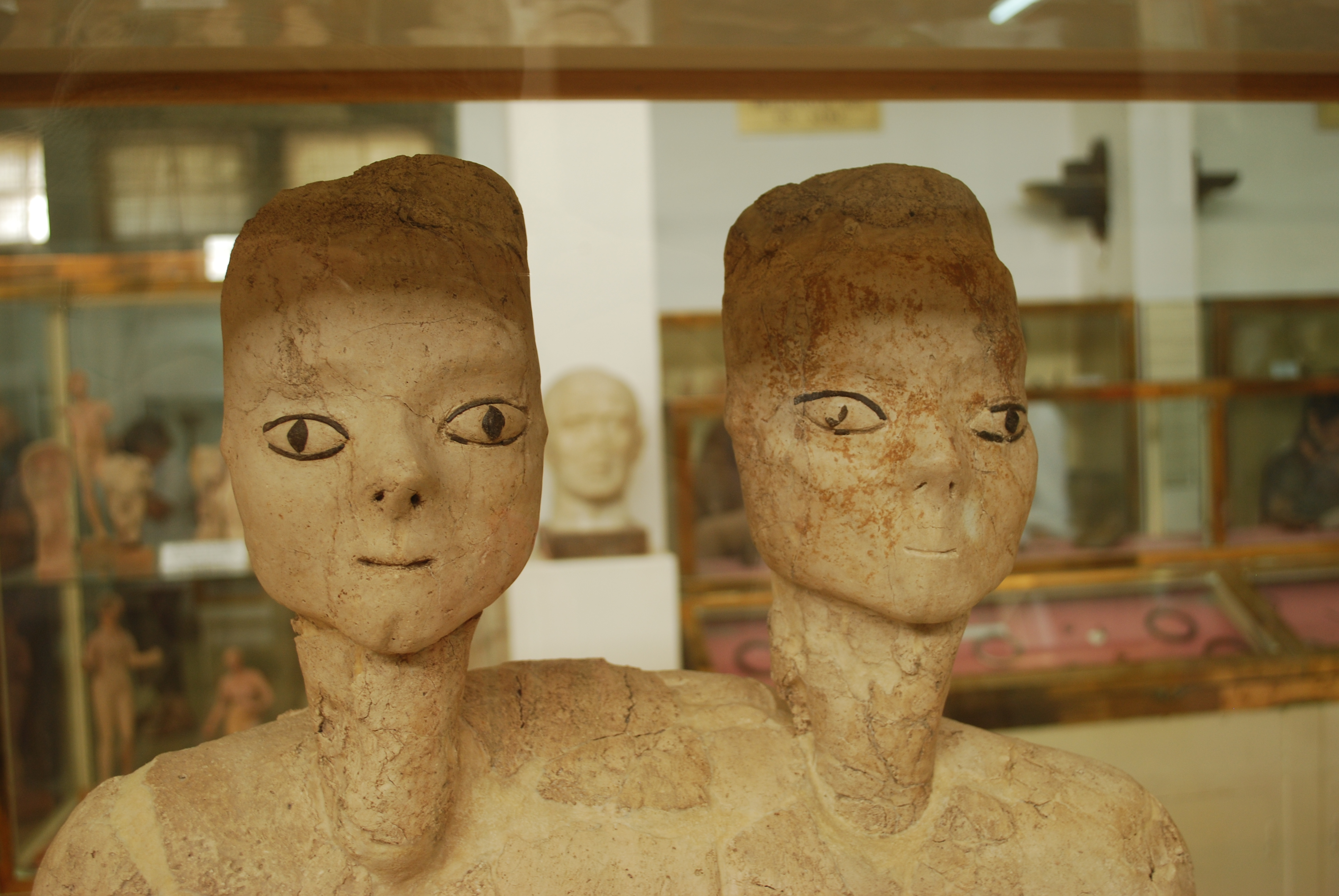
'Ain Ghazal Statues, found at 'Ain Ghazal in Jordan, are considered to be one of the earliest large-scale representations of the human form dating back to around 7250 BC.

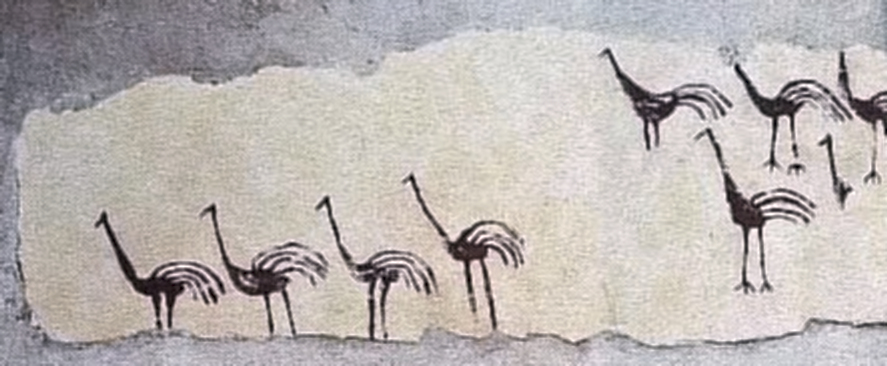
Neolithic wall painting from Tell Bouqras at the Deir ez-Zor Museum, Syria

Around 10,000 BC the first fully developed Neolithic cultures belonging to the phase Pre-Pottery Neolithic A (PPNA) appeared in the Fertile Crescent. Around 10,700–9400 BC a settlement was established in Tell Qaramel, 10 miles (16 km) north of Aleppo. The settlement included two temples dating to 9650 BC. Around 9000 BC during the PPNA, one of the world's first towns, Jericho, appeared in the Levant. It was surrounded by a stone wall, may have contained a population of up to 2,000–3,000 people, and contained a massive stone tower. Around 6400 BC the Halaf culture appeared in Syria and Northern Mesopotamia.

In 1981, a team of researchers from the Maison de l'Orient et de la Méditerranée, including Jacques Cauvin and Oliver Aurenche, divided Near East Neolithic chronology into ten periods (0 to 9) based on social, economic and cultural characteristics. In 2002, Danielle Stordeur and Frédéric Abbès advanced this system with a division into five periods.

1. Natufian between 12,000 and 10,200 BC,
2. Khiamian between 10,200 and 8800 BC, PPNA: Sultanian (Jericho), Mureybetian,
3. Early PPNB (PPNB ancien) between 8800 and 7600 BC, middle PPNB (PPNB moyen) between 7600 and 6900 BC,
4. Late PPNB (PPNB récent) between 7500 and 7000 BC,
5. A PPNB (sometimes called PPNC) transitional stage (PPNB final) in which Halaf and dark faced burnished ware begin to emerge between 6900 and 6400 BC.

They also advanced the idea of a transitional stage between the PPNA and PPNB between 8800 and 8600 BC at sites like Jerf el Ahmar and Tell Aswad.

==== Southern Mesopotamia ====
Alluvial plains (Sumer/Elam). Low rainfall makes irrigation systems necessary. Ubaid culture originated from 6200 BC.

=== Northeastern Africa ===
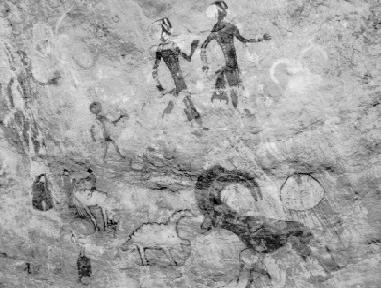
Algerian cave paintings depicting hunting scenes

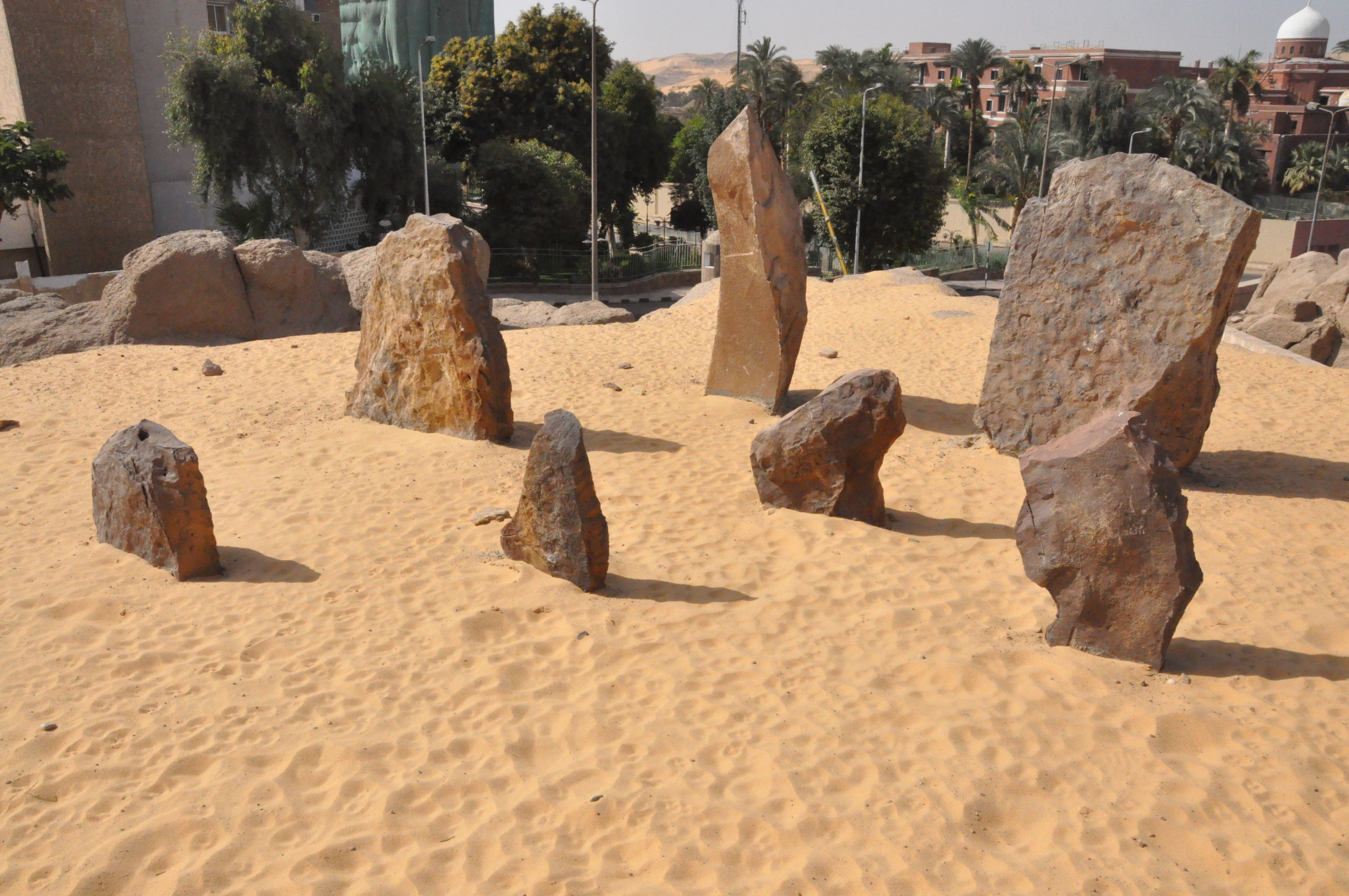
Megaliths from Nabta Playa displayed in the Aswan Nubian museum

The earliest evidence of Neolithic culture in northeast Africa was found in the archaeological sites of Bir Kiseiba and Nabta Playa in what is now southwest Egypt. Domestication of sheep and goats reached Egypt from the Near East possibly as early as 6000 BC. Graeme Barker states "The first indisputable evidence for domestic plants and animals in the Nile valley is not until the early fifth millennium BC in northern Egypt and a thousand years later further south, in both cases as part of strategies that still relied heavily on fishing, hunting, and the gathering of wild plants" and suggests that these subsistence changes were not due to farmers migrating from the Near East but was an indigenous development, with cereals either indigenous or obtained through exchange. Other scholars argue that the primary stimulus for agriculture and domesticated animals (as well as mud-brick architecture and other Neolithic cultural features) in Egypt was from the Middle East.

=== Northwestern Africa ===
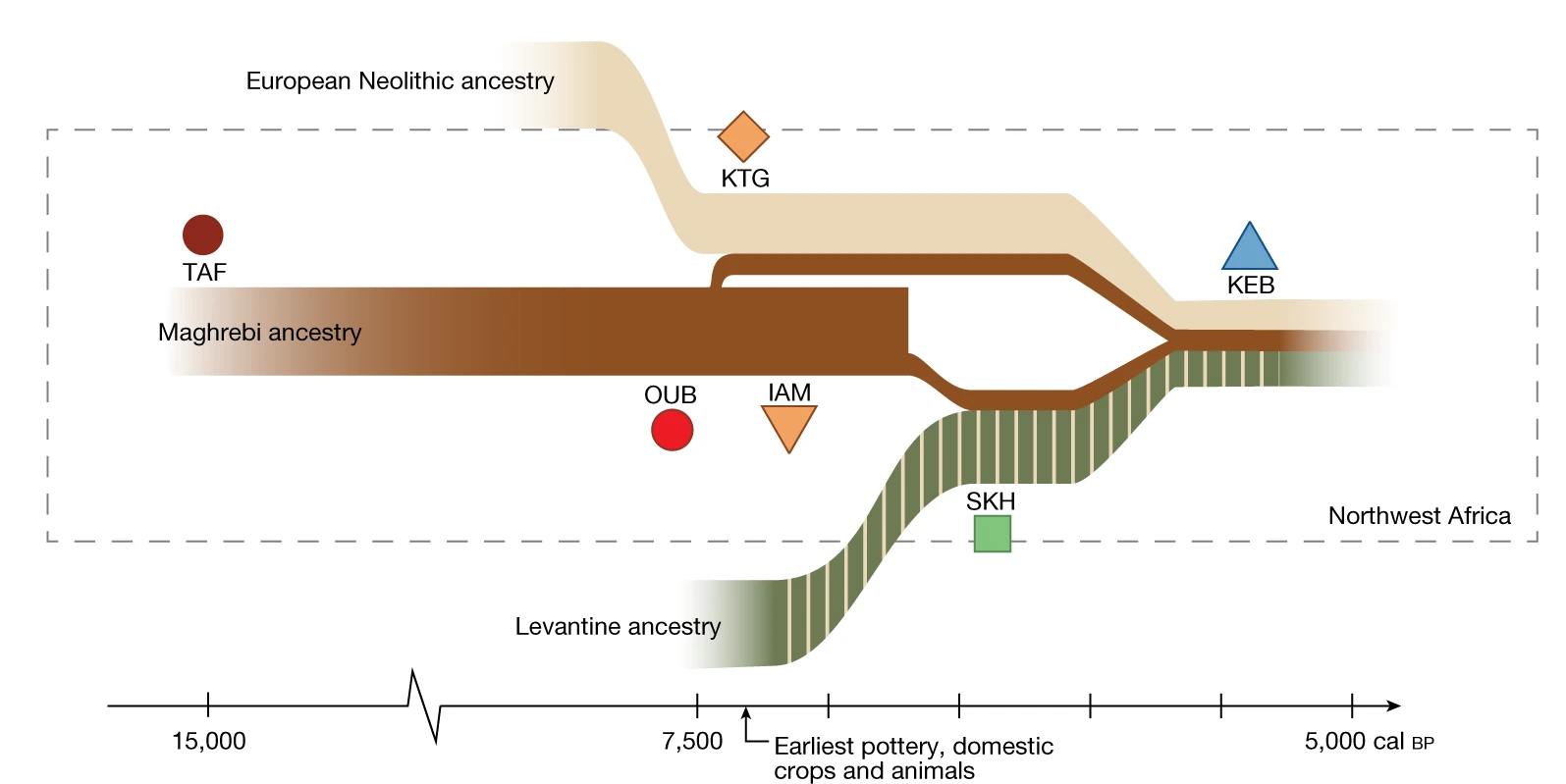
The neolithization of Northwestern Africa corresponded to the arrival of European migration circa 5500 BC (■), and a wave of Levantine migration circa 5000 BC (■), with some local admixture (■).

The neolithization of Northwestern Africa was initiated by Iberian, Levantine (and perhaps Sicilian) migrants around 5500–5300 BC. During the Early Neolithic period, farming was introduced by Europeans and was subsequently adopted by the locals. During the Middle Neolithic period, an influx of ancestry from the Levant appeared in Northwestern Africa, coinciding with the arrival of pastoralism in the region. The earliest evidence for pottery, domestic cereals and animal husbandry is found in Morocco, specifically at Kaf el-Ghar.

=== Sub-Saharan Africa ===
The Pastoral Neolithic was a period in Africa's prehistory marking the beginning of food production on the continent following the Later Stone Age. In contrast to the Neolithic in other parts of the world, which saw the development of farming societies, the first form of African food production was mobile pastoralism, or ways of life centered on the herding and management of livestock. The term "Pastoral Neolithic" is used most often by archaeologists to describe early pastoralist periods in the Sahara, as well as in eastern Africa.

The Savanna Pastoral Neolithic or SPN (formerly known as the Stone Bowl Culture) is a collection of ancient societies that appeared in the Rift Valley of East Africa and surrounding areas during a time period known as the Pastoral Neolithic. They were South Cushitic speaking pastoralists, who tended to bury their dead in cairns whilst their toolkit was characterized by stone bowls, pestles, grindstones and earthenware pots. Through archaeology, historical linguistics and archaeogenetics, they conventionally have been identified with the area's first Afroasiatic-speaking settlers. Archaeological dating of livestock bones and burial cairns has also established the cultural complex as the earliest center of pastoralism and stone construction in the region.

=== Europe ===
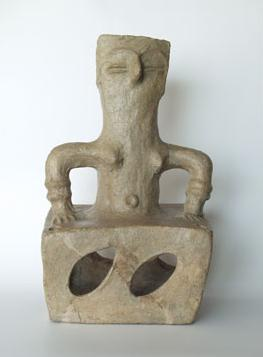
Female figure from Tumba Madžari, North Macedonia

Map showing distribution of some of the main culture complexes in Neolithic Europe, c. 3500 BC

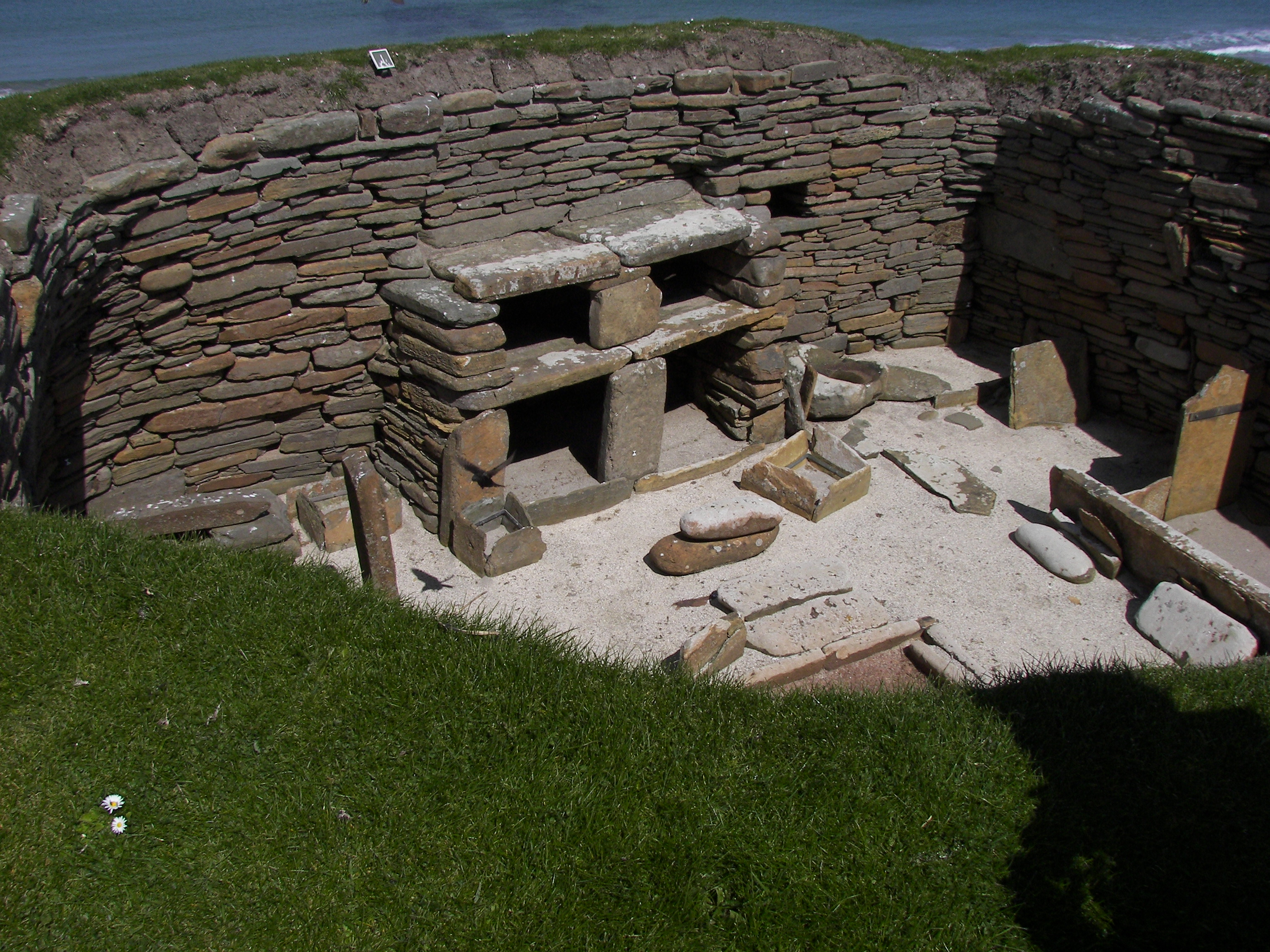
Skara Brae, Scotland. Evidence of home furnishings (shelves)

In southeast Europe agrarian societies first appeared in the 7th millennium BC, attested by one of the earliest farming sites of Europe, discovered in Vashtëmi, southeastern Albania and dating back to 6500 BC. Most of Western Europe followed over the next two thousand years, but in some parts of Northwest Europe the neolithic era began much later and lasted just under 3,000 years from c. 4500 BC–1700 BC. Recent advances in archaeogenetics have confirmed that the spread of agriculture from the Middle East to Europe was strongly correlated with the migration of early farmers from Anatolia about 9,000 years ago, and was not just a cultural exchange.

Anthropomorphic figurines have been found in the Balkans from 6000 BC, and in Central Europe by around 5800 BC (La Hoguette). Among the earliest cultural complexes of this area are the Sesklo culture in Thessaly, which later expanded in the Balkans giving rise to Starčevo-Körös (Cris), Linearbandkeramik, and Vinča. Through a combination of cultural diffusion and migration of peoples, the Neolithic traditions spread west and northwards to reach northwestern Europe by around 4500 BC. The Vinča culture may have created the earliest system of writing, the Vinča signs, though archaeologist Shan Winn believes they most likely represented pictograms and ideograms rather than a truly developed form of writing.

The Cucuteni-Trypillian culture built enormous settlements in Romania, Moldova and Ukraine from 5300 to 2300 BC. The megalithic temple complexes of Ġgantija on the Mediterranean island of Gozo (in the Maltese archipelago) and of Mnajdra (Malta) are notable for their gigantic Neolithic structures, the oldest of which date back to around 3600 BC. The Hypogeum of Ħal-Saflieni, Paola, Malta, is a subterranean structure excavated around 2500 BC; originally a sanctuary, it became a necropolis, the only prehistoric underground temple in the world, and shows a degree of artistry in stone sculpture unique in prehistory to the Maltese islands. After 2500 BC, these islands were depopulated for several decades until the arrival of a new influx of Bronze Age immigrants, a culture that cremated its dead and introduced smaller megalithic structures called dolmens to Malta. In most cases there are small chambers here, with the cover made of a large slab placed on upright stones. They are claimed to belong to a population different from that which built the previous megalithic temples. It is presumed the population arrived from Sicily because of the similarity of Maltese dolmens to some small constructions found there.

With some exceptions, population levels rose rapidly at the beginning of the Neolithic until they reached the carrying capacity. This was followed by a population crash of "enormous magnitude" after 5000 BC, with levels remaining low during the next 1,500 years. Populations began to rise after 3500 BC, with further dips and rises occurring between 3000 and 2500 BC but varying in date between regions. Around this time is the Neolithic decline, when populations collapsed across most of Europe, possibly caused by climatic conditions, plague, or mass migration.

=== South and East Asia ===
Settled life, encompassing the transition from foraging to farming and pastoralism, began in South Asia in the region of Balochistan, Pakistan, around 7,000 BC. At the site of Mehrgarh, Balochistan, presence can be documented of the domestication of wheat and barley, rapidly followed by that of goats, sheep, and cattle. In April 2006, it was announced in the scientific journal Nature that the oldest (and first Early Neolithic) evidence for the drilling of teeth in vivo (using bow drills and flint tips) was found in Mehrgarh.

In South India, the Neolithic began by 3000 BC and lasted until around 1400 BC when the Megalithic transition period began. South Indian Neolithic is characterized by Ash mounds (created from ritual burning of wood, dung and animal matter) from 2500 BC in Andhra pradesh and karnataka region and later expanded to Tamil Nadu.

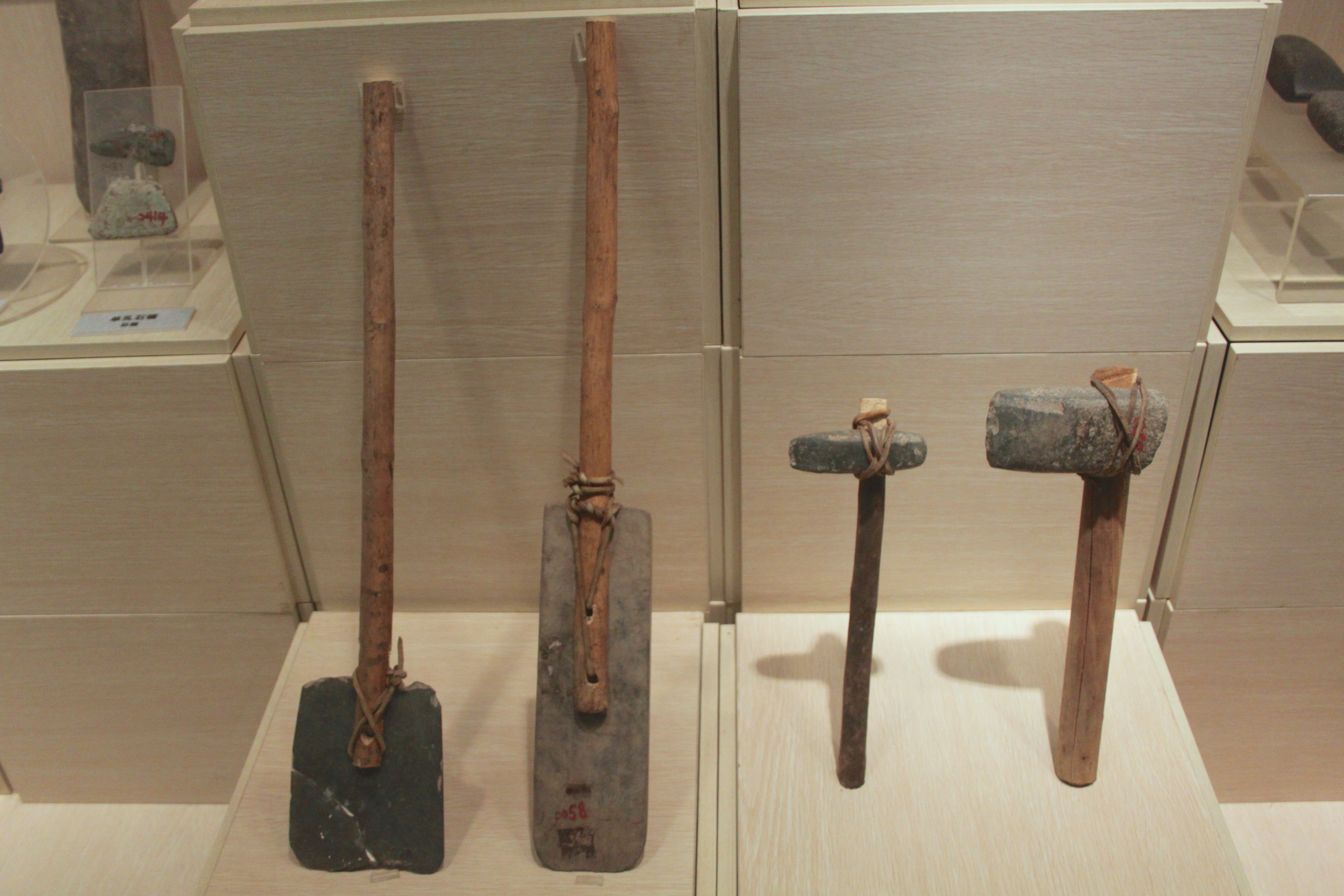
Neolithic artifacts from China

In East Asia, the earliest sites include the Nanzhuangtou culture around 9500–9000 BC, Pengtoushan culture around 7500–6100 BC, and Peiligang culture around 7000–5000 BC. The prehistoric Beifudi site near Yixian in Hebei Province, China, contains relics of a culture contemporaneous with the Cishan and Xinglongwa cultures of about 6000–5000 BC, Neolithic cultures east of the Taihang Mountains, filling in an archaeological gap between the two Northern Chinese cultures. The total excavated area is more than 1,200 square yards (1,000 m^{2}; 0.10 ha), and the collection of Neolithic findings at the site encompasses two phases. Between 3000 and 1900 BC, the Longshan culture existed in the middle and lower Yellow River valley areas of northern China. Towards the end of the 3rd millennium BC, the population decreased sharply in most of the region and many of the larger centres were abandoned, possibly due to environmental change linked to the end of the Holocene Climatic Optimum.

The 'Neolithic' (defined in this paragraph as using polished stone implements) remains a living tradition in small and extremely remote and inaccessible pockets of West Papua. Polished stone adze and axes are used in the present day (as of 2008) in areas where the availability of metal implements is limited. This is likely to cease altogether in the next few years as the older generation die off and steel blades and chainsaws prevail.

In 2012, news was released about a new farming site discovered in Munam-ri, Goseong, Gangwon Province, South Korea, which may be the earliest farmland known to date in east Asia. "No remains of an agricultural field from the Neolithic period have been found in any East Asian country before, the institute said, adding that the discovery reveals that the history of agricultural cultivation at least began during the period on the Korean Peninsula". The farm was dated between 3600 and 3000 BC. Pottery, stone projectile points, and possible houses were also found. "In 2002, researchers discovered prehistoric earthenware, jade earrings, among other items in the area". The research team will perform accelerator mass spectrometry (AMS) dating to retrieve a more precise date for the site.

=== The Americas ===
In Mesoamerica, a similar set of events (i.e., crop domestication and sedentary lifestyles) occurred by around 4500 BC in South America, but possibly as early as 11,000–10,000 BC. These cultures are usually not referred to as belonging to the Neolithic; in North America, different terms are used such as Formative stage instead of mid-late Neolithic, Archaic Era instead of Early Neolithic, and Paleo-Indian for the preceding period.

The Formative stage is equivalent to the Neolithic Revolution period in Europe, Asia, and Africa. In the southwestern United States it occurred from 500 to 1200 AD when there was a dramatic increase in population and development of large villages supported by agriculture based on dryland farming of corn (maize), and later, beans, squash, and domesticated turkeys. During this period the bow and arrow and ceramic pottery were also introduced. In later periods cities of considerable size developed, and some metallurgy by 700 BC.

=== Australia ===
Australia, in contrast to New Guinea, has generally been held not to have had a Neolithic period, with a hunter-gatherer lifestyle continuing until the arrival of Europeans. This view can be challenged in terms of the definition of agriculture, but "Neolithic" remains a rarely used and not very useful concept in discussing Australian prehistory.

== Cultural characteristics ==
=== Social organization ===
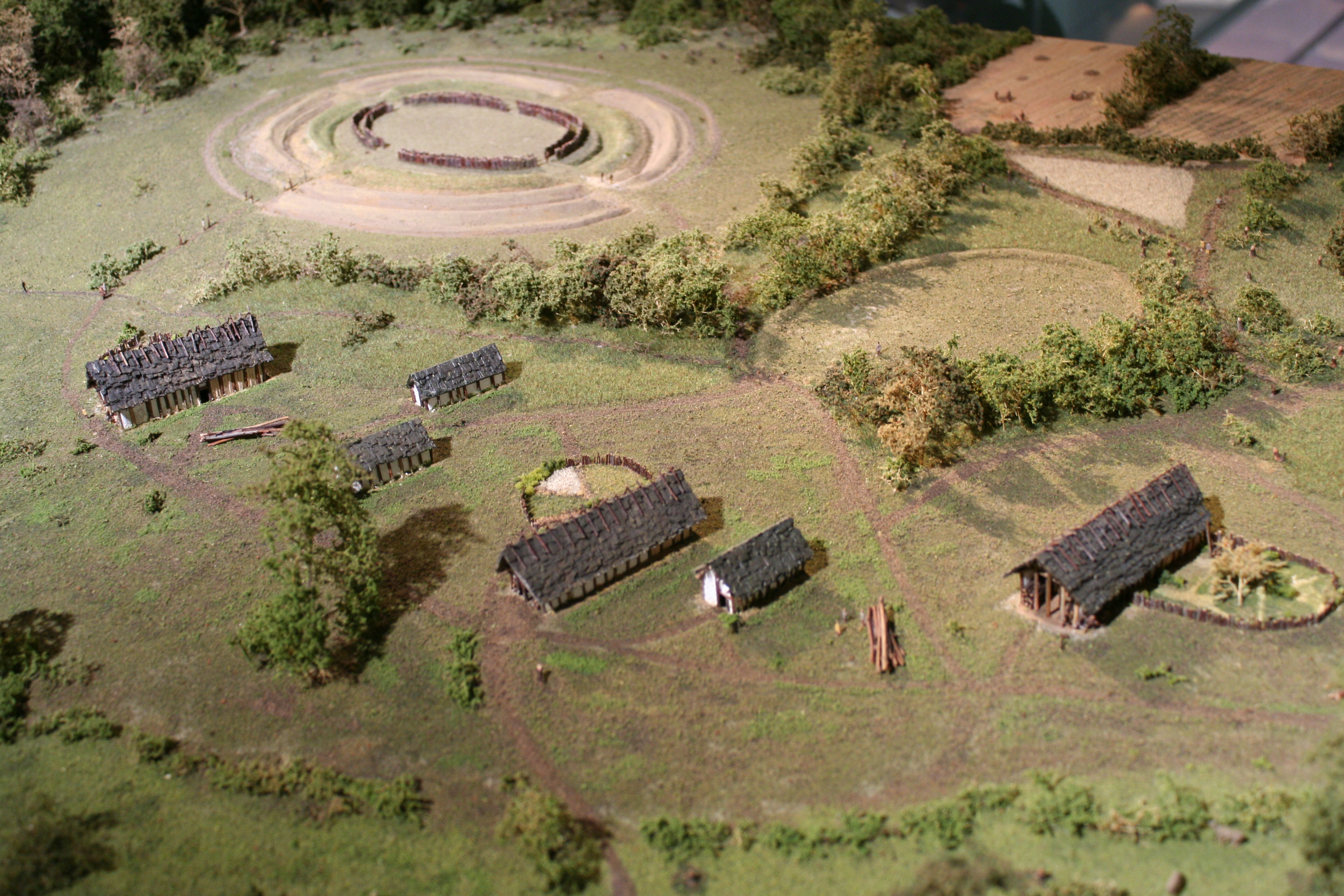
Model of a Linear Pottery culture settlement, showing longhouses, circular enclosures, and fields

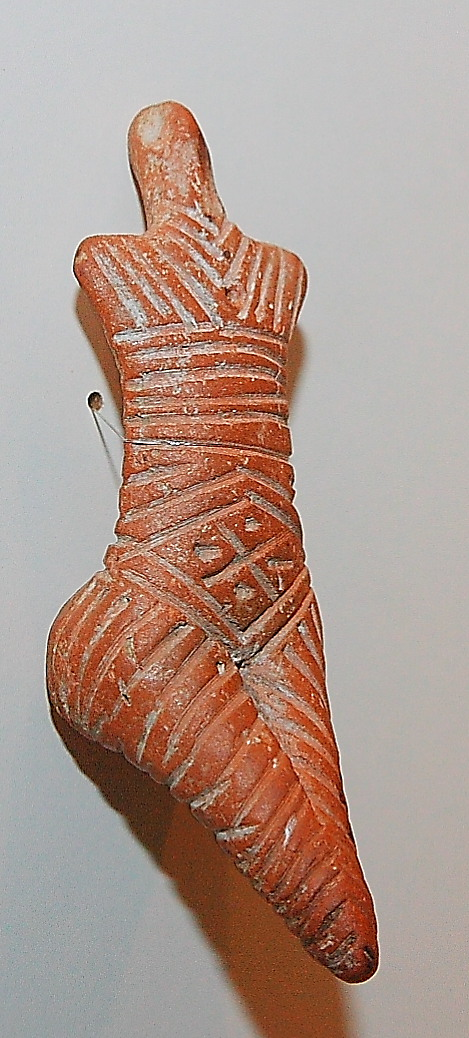
Anthropomorphic Neolithic ceramic figurine

During most of the Neolithic age of Eurasia, people lived in small tribes composed of multiple bands or lineages. There is little scientific evidence of developed social stratification in most Neolithic societies; social stratification is more associated with the later Bronze Age. Although some late Eurasian Neolithic societies formed complex stratified chiefdoms or even states, generally states evolved in Eurasia only with the rise of metallurgy, and most Neolithic societies on the whole were relatively simple and egalitarian. Beyond Eurasia, however, states were formed during the local Neolithic in three areas, namely in the Preceramic Andes with the Caral-Supe Civilization, Formative Mesoamerica and Ancient Hawaiʻi. However, most Neolithic societies were noticeably more hierarchical than the Upper Paleolithic cultures that preceded them and hunter-gatherer cultures in general.

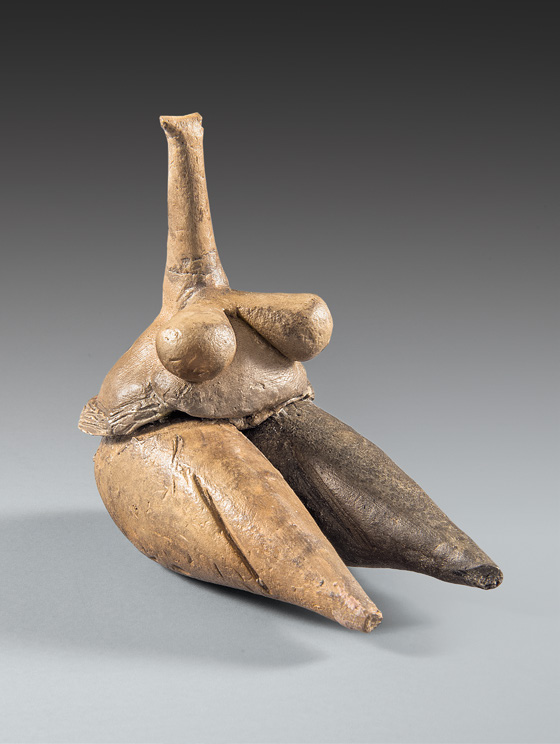
Clay human figurine (Fertility goddess) Tappeh Sarab, Kermanshah c. 7000–6100 BC, National Museum of Iran

The domestication of large animals (c. 8000 BC) resulted in a dramatic increase in social inequality in most of the areas where it occurred; New Guinea being a notable exception. Possession of livestock allowed competition between households and resulted in inherited inequalities of wealth. Neolithic pastoralists who controlled large herds gradually acquired more livestock, and this made economic inequalities more pronounced. However, evidence of social inequality is still disputed, as settlements such as Çatalhöyük reveal a lack of difference in the size of homes and burial sites, suggesting a more egalitarian society with no evidence of the concept of capital, although some homes do appear slightly larger or more elaborately decorated than others.

Families and households were still largely independent economically, and the household was probably the center of life. However, excavations in Central Europe have revealed that early Neolithic Linear Ceramic cultures ("Linearbandkeramik") were building large arrangements of circular ditches between 4800 and 4600 BC. These structures (and their later counterparts such as causewayed enclosures, burial mounds, and henge) required considerable time and labour to construct, which suggests that some influential individuals were able to organise and direct human labour – though non-hierarchical and voluntary work remain possibilities.

There is a large body of evidence for fortified settlements at Linearbandkeramik sites along the Rhine, as at least some villages were fortified for some time with a palisade and an outer ditch. Settlements with palisades and weapon-traumatized bones, such as those found at the Talheim Death Pit, have been discovered and demonstrate that "...systematic violence between groups" and warfare was probably much more common during the Neolithic than in the preceding Paleolithic period. This supplanted an earlier view of the Linear Pottery Culture as living a "peaceful, unfortified lifestyle". Violence increased toward the end of this culture which existed at 5500–4500 BC. In 2024, a study suggested a peaceful explanation to the reduction in the size of male population observed worldwide 5000–3000 years ago.

Control of labour and inter-group conflict is characteristic of tribal groups with social rank that are headed by a charismatic individual – either a 'big man' or a proto-chief – functioning as a lineage-group head. Whether a non-hierarchical system of organization existed is debatable, and there is no evidence that explicitly suggests that Neolithic societies functioned under any dominating class or individual, as was the case in the chiefdoms of the European Early Bronze Age. Possible exceptions to this include Iraq during the Ubaid period and England beginning in the Early Neolithic (4100–3000 BC). Theories to explain the apparent implied egalitarianism of Neolithic (and Paleolithic) societies have arisen, notably the Marxist concept of primitive communism.

Phylogenies reconstructed from modern genetic data indicates an extreme drop in Y-chromosomal diversity occurred during the Neolithic, with effective population size for the mitochondria up to 17 times higher than for the Y-chromosomes during this period. The causes of this bottleneck remain poorly understood. At a basic level, it can likely be attributed to a culture-induced change in the distribution of male reproductive success, with possible explanations ranging from an increased incidence of violence and male mortality during the Neolithic to the rise of patrilineal segmentary groups with varying reproductive success due to polygyny.

=== Shelter and sedentism ===
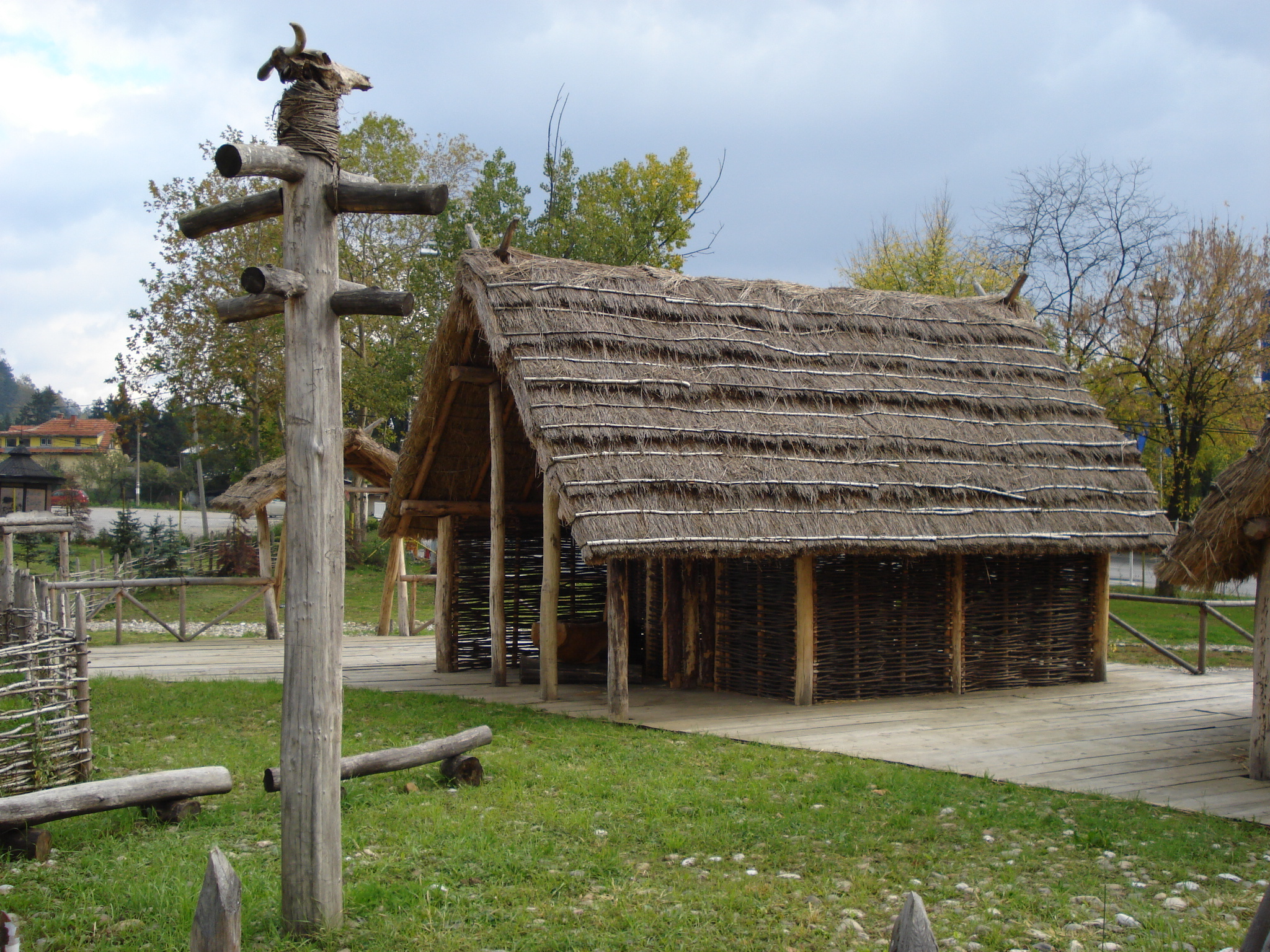
Reconstruction of Neolithic house in Tuzla, Bosnia and Herzegovina

The shelter of early people changed dramatically from the Upper Paleolithic to the Neolithic era. In the Paleolithic, people did not normally live in permanent constructions. In the Neolithic, mud brick houses started appearing that were coated with plaster. This increased use of clay for building, along with the development of pottery and other clay-based artifacts, has led some to refer to the Neolithic period as the Age of Clay. The growth of agriculture made permanent houses far more common. At Çatalhöyük 9,000 years ago, doorways were made on the roof, with ladders positioned both on the inside and outside of the houses. Stilt-house settlements were common in the Alpine and Pianura Padana (Terramare) region. Remains have been found in the Ljubljana Marsh in Slovenia and at the Mondsee and Attersee lakes in Upper Austria, for example.

=== Agriculture ===
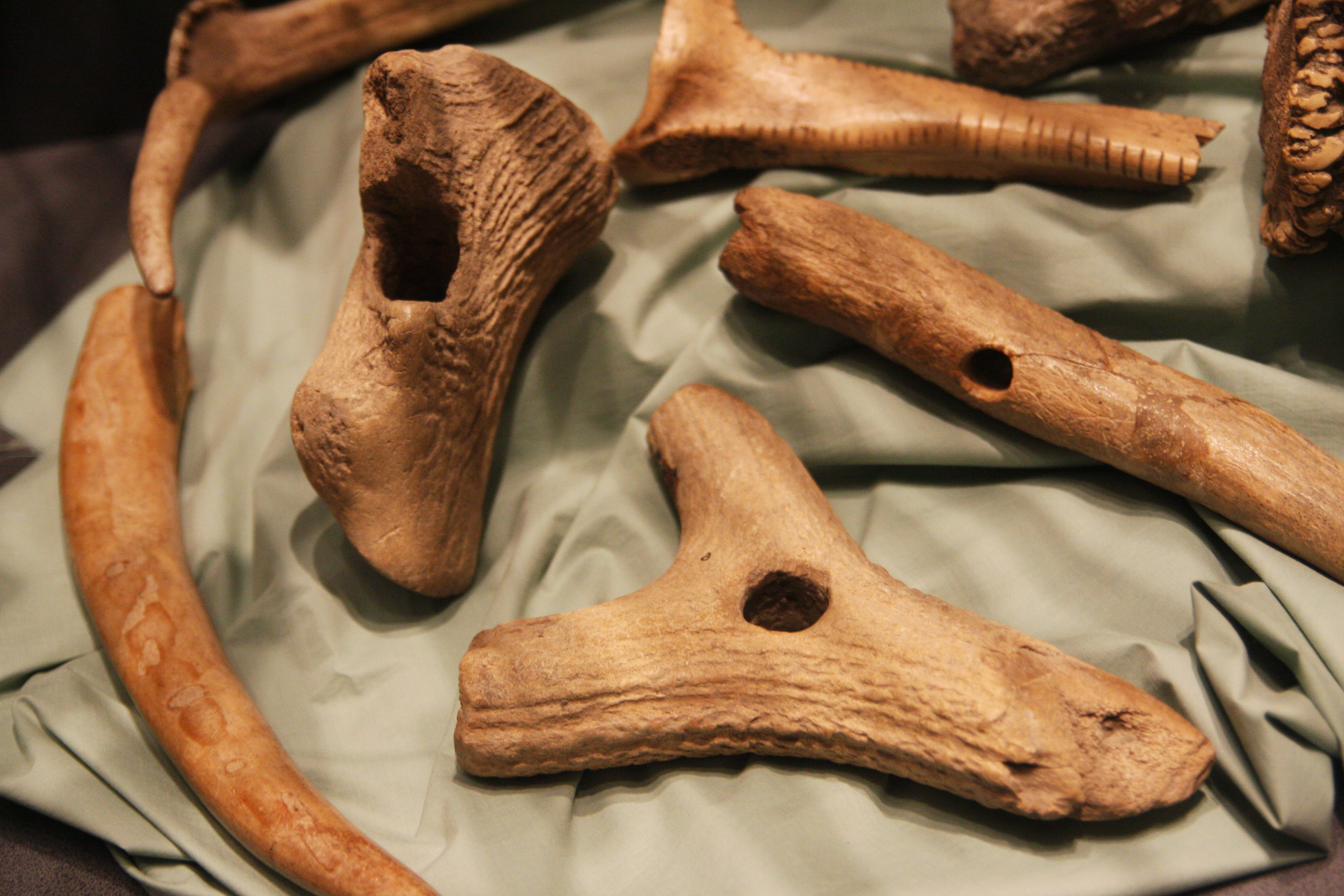
A Cucuteni-Trypillian culture deer antler plough

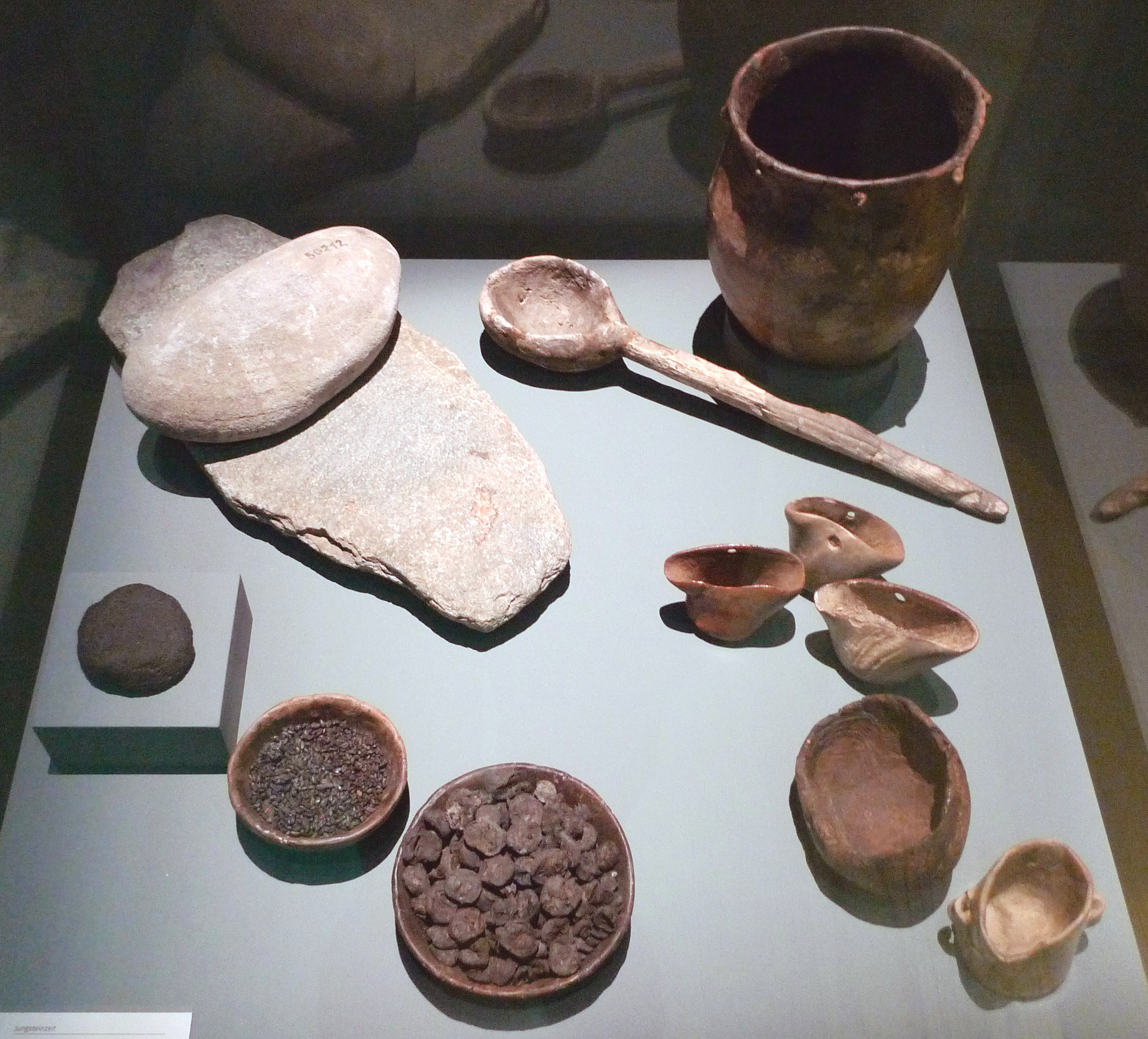
Food and cooking items retrieved at a European Neolithic site: millstones, charred bread, grains and small apples, a clay cooking pot, and containers made of antlers and wood

A significant and far-reaching shift in human subsistence and lifestyle was to be brought about in areas where crop farming and cultivation were first developed: the previous reliance on an essentially nomadic hunter-gatherer subsistence technique or pastoral transhumance was at first supplemented, and then increasingly replaced by, a reliance upon the foods produced from cultivated lands. These developments are also believed to have greatly encouraged the growth of settlements, since it may be supposed that the increased need to spend more time and labor in tending crop fields required more localized dwellings. This trend would continue into the Bronze Age, eventually giving rise to permanently settled farming towns, and later cities and states whose larger populations could be sustained by the increased productivity from cultivated lands.

The profound differences in human interactions and subsistence methods associated with the onset of early agricultural practices in the Neolithic have been called the Neolithic Revolution, a term coined in the 1920s by the Australian archaeologist Vere Gordon Childe.

One potential benefit of the development and increasing sophistication of farming technology was the possibility of producing surplus crop yields, in other words, food supplies in excess of the immediate needs of the community. Surpluses could be stored for later use, or possibly traded for other necessities or luxuries. Agricultural life afforded securities that nomadic life could not, and sedentary farming populations grew faster than nomadic.

However, early farmers were also adversely affected in times of famine, such as may be caused by drought or pests. In instances where agriculture had become the predominant way of life, the sensitivity to these shortages could be particularly acute, affecting agrarian populations to an extent that otherwise may not have been routinely experienced by prior hunter-gatherer communities. Nevertheless, agrarian communities generally proved successful, and their growth and the expansion of territory under cultivation continued.

Another significant change undergone by many of these newly agrarian communities was one of diet. Pre-agrarian diets varied by region, season, available local plant and animal resources and degree of pastoralism and hunting. Post-agrarian diet was restricted to a limited package of successfully cultivated cereal grains, plants and to a variable extent domesticated animals and animal products. Supplementation of diet by hunting and gathering was to variable degrees precluded by the increase in population above the carrying capacity of the land and a high sedentary local population concentration. In some cultures, there would have been a significant shift toward increased starch and plant protein. The relative nutritional benefits and drawbacks of these dietary changes and their overall impact on early societal development are still debated.

In addition, increased population density, decreased population mobility, increased continuous proximity to domesticated animals, and continuous occupation of comparatively population-dense sites would have altered sanitation needs and patterns of disease.

=== Lithic technology ===
The identifying characteristic of Neolithic technology is the use of polished or ground stone tools, in contrast to the flaked stone tools used during the Paleolithic era.

Neolithic people were skilled farmers, manufacturing a range of tools necessary for the tending, harvesting and processing of crops (such as sickle blades and grinding stones) and food production (e.g. pottery, bone implements). They were also skilled manufacturers of a range of other types of stone tools and ornaments, including projectile points, beads, and statuettes. But what allowed forest clearance on a large scale was the polished stone axe above all other tools. Together with the adze, fashioning wood for shelter, structures and canoes for example, this enabled them to exploit the newly developed farmland.

Neolithic peoples in the Levant, Anatolia, Syria, northern Mesopotamia and Central Asia were also accomplished builders, utilizing mud-brick to construct houses and villages. At Çatalhöyük, houses were plastered and painted with elaborate scenes of humans and animals. In Europe, long houses built from wattle and daub were constructed. Elaborate tombs were built for the dead. These tombs are particularly numerous in Ireland, where there are many thousand still in existence. Neolithic people in the British Isles built long barrows and chamber tombs for their dead and causewayed camps, henges, flint mines and cursus monuments. It was also important to figure out ways of preserving food for future months, such as fashioning relatively airtight containers, and using substances like salt as preservatives.

The peoples of the Americas and the Pacific mostly retained the Neolithic level of tool technology until the time of European contact. Exceptions include copper hatchets and spearheads in the Great Lakes region.

=== Clothing ===
Most clothing appears to have been made of animal skins, as indicated by finds of large numbers of bone and antler pins that are ideal for fastening leather. Wool cloth and linen might have become available during the later Neolithic, as suggested by finds of perforated stones that (depending on size) may have served as spindle whorls or loom weights.

== List of early settlements ==
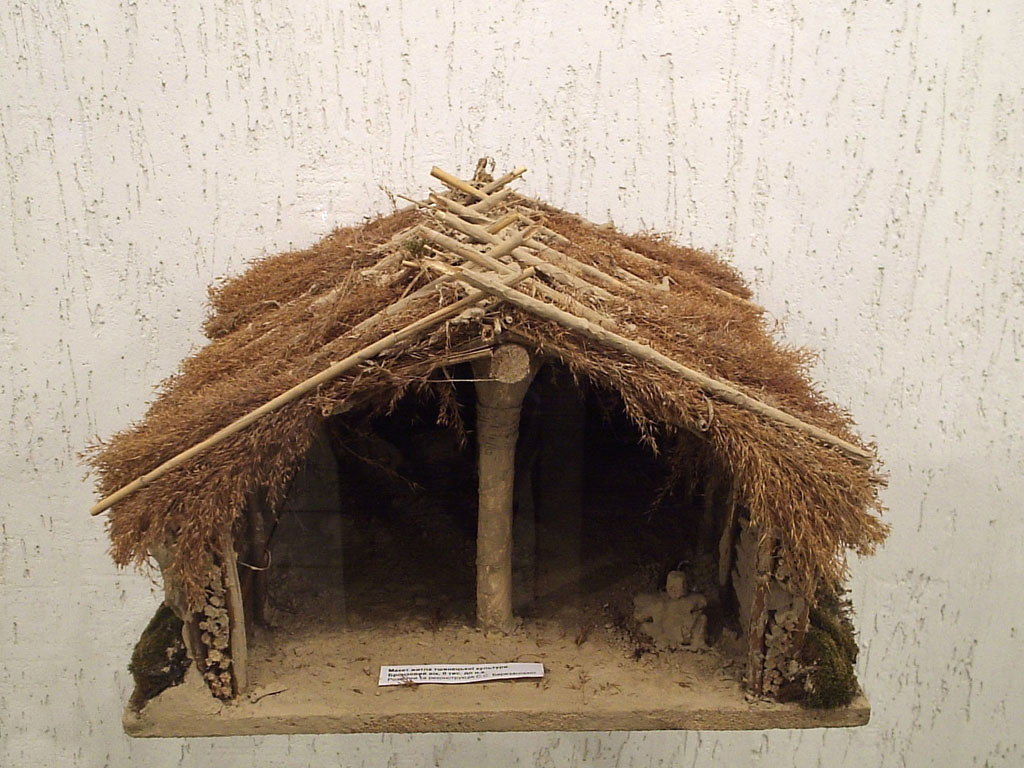
Reconstruction of a Cucuteni-Trypillian hut, in the Tripillian Museum, Ukraine

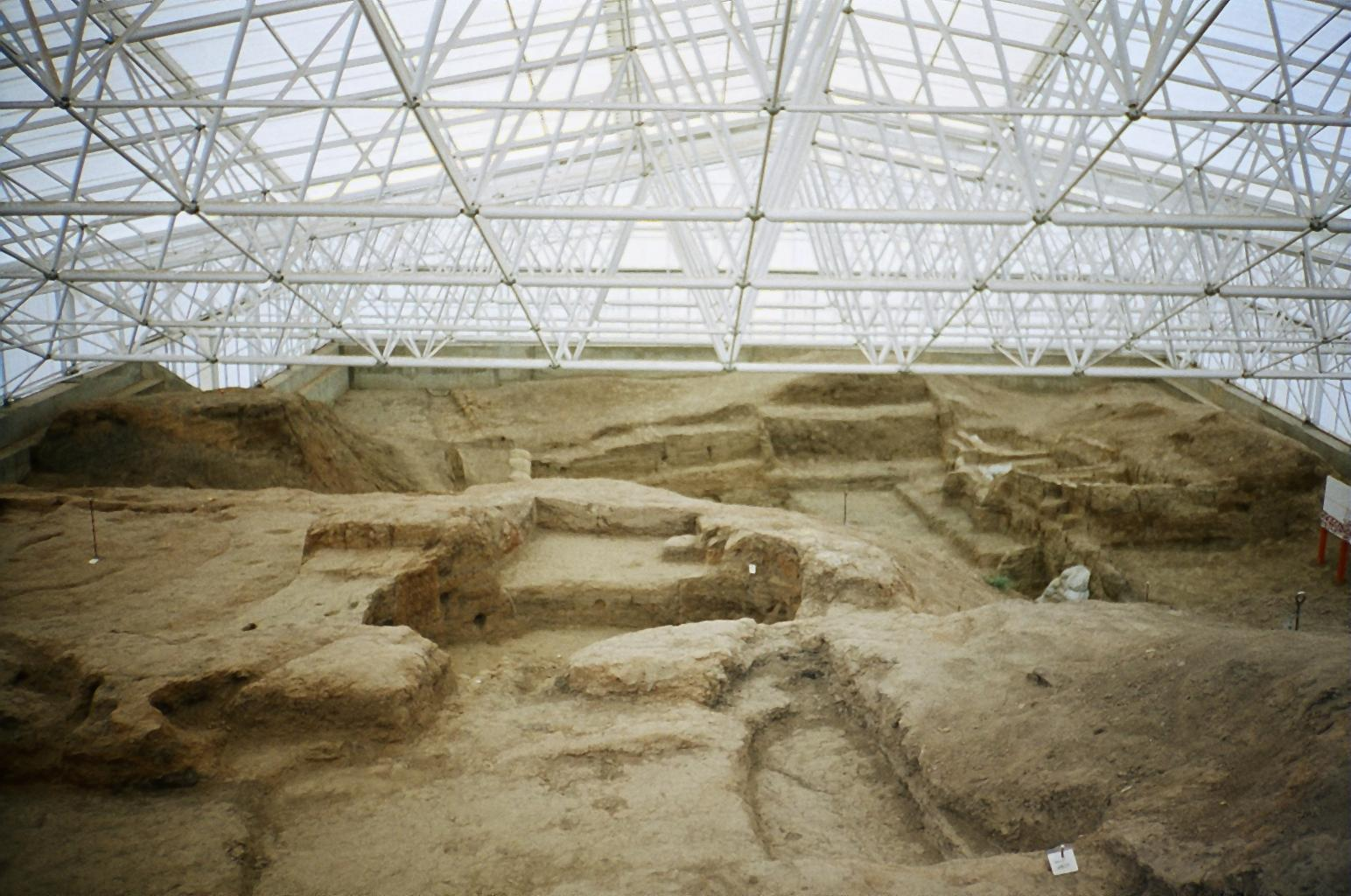
Archaeological site of Çatalhöyük in the Konya Plain in Turkey

Neolithic human settlements include:

name	location	early date (BC)	late date (BC)	comments
Tell Qaramel	Syria	10,700	9400	
Franchthi Cave	Greece	10,000		reoccupied between 7500 and 6000 BC
Göbekli Tepe	Turkey	9600	8000	
Nanzhuangtou	Hebei, China	9500	9000	
Byblos	Lebanon	8800	7000	
Jericho (Tell es-Sultan)	Palestine	9500		arising from the earlier Epipaleolithic Natufian culture
Pulli settlement	Estonia	8500	5000	oldest known settlement of Kunda culture
Aşıklı Höyük	Central Anatolia, Turkey, an Aceramic Neolithic period settlement	8200	7400	correlating with the E/MPPNB in the Levant
Nevali Cori	Turkey	8000		
Bhirrana	India	7600	7200	Hakra ware
Pengtoushan culture	China	7500	6100	rice residues were carbon-14 dated to 8200–7800 BC
Çatalhöyük	Turkey	7500	5700	
Mentesh Tepe and Kamiltepe	Azerbaijan	7000	3000	
'Ain Ghazal	Jordan	7250	5000	
Chogha Bonut	Iran	7200		
Jeitun	Turkmenistan	7200	4500	
Jhusi	India	7100		
Motza	Israel	7000		
Ganj Dareh	Iran	7000		
Lahuradewa	India	7000		presence of rice cultivation, ceramics etc.
Jiahu	China	7000	5800	
Knossos	Crete	7000		
Khirokitia	Cyprus	7000	4000	
Mehrgarh	Pakistan	7000	5500	aceramic but elaborate culture including mud brick, houses, agriculture etc.
Sesklo	Greece	6850		with a 660-year margin of error
Horton Plains	Sri Lanka	6700		cultivation of oats and barley as early as 11,000 BC
Porodin	North Macedonia	6500		
Padah-Lin Caves	Burma	6000		
Petnica	Serbia	6000		
Vinča-Belo Brdo	Serbia	5700		
Pločnik (archaeological site)	Serbia	5500	4700	Earliest known copper tools in Europe, dated 5500 BC.
Stara Zagora	Bulgaria	5500		
Cucuteni-Trypillian culture	Ukraine, Moldova and Romania	5500	2750	
Tell Zeidan	northern Syria	5500	4000	
Tabon Cave Complex	Quezon, Palawan, Philippines	5000	2000	
Hemudu culture, large-scale rice plantation	China	5000	4500	
The Megalithic Temples of Malta	Malta	3600		
Knap of Howar and Skara Brae	Orkney, Scotland	3500	3100	
Brú na Bóinne	Ireland	3500		
Lough Gur	Ireland	3000		
Shengavit Settlement	Armenia	3000	2200	
Norte Chico civilization, 30 aceramic Neolithic period settlements	northern coastal Peru	3000	1700	
Tichit Neolithic village on the Tagant Plateau	central southern Mauritania	2000	500	
Oaxaca, state	Southwestern Mexico	2000		by 2000 BC Neolithic sedentary villages had been established in the Central Valleys region of this state.
Lajia	China	2000		
Mumun pottery period	Korean Peninsula	1800	1500	
Neolithic revolution	Japan	500	300	

The world's oldest known engineered roadway, the Post Track in England, dates from 3838 BC and the world's oldest freestanding structure is the Neolithic temple of Ġgantija in Gozo, Malta.

== List of cultures and sites ==
Note: Dates are very approximate, and are only given for a rough estimate; consult each culture for specific time periods.

Early Neolithic
Periodization: The Levant: 9500–8000 BC; Europe: 7000–4000 BC; Elsewhere: varies greatly, depending on region.

- Pre-Pottery Neolithic A (Levant, 9500–8000 BC)
- Nanzhuangtou (China, 8500 BC)
- Franchthi Cave (Greece, 7000 BC)
- Cishan culture (China, 6500–5000 BC)
- Sesklo village (Greece, c. 6300 BC)
- Starcevo-Criş culture (Starčevo-Körös-Criş culture) (Balkans, 5800–4500 BC)
- Katundas Cavern (Albania, 6th millennium BC)
- Dudeşti culture (Romania, 6th millennium BC)
- Beixin culture (China, 5300–4100 BC)
- Tamil Nadu culture (India, 3000–2800 BC)
- Mentesh Tepe and Kamiltepe (Azerbaijan, 7000–3000 BC)

Middle Neolithic
Periodization: The Levant: 8000–6500 BC; Europe: 5500–3500 BC; Elsewhere: varies greatly, depending on region.

- Pre-Pottery Neolithic B (Levant, 7600–6000 BC)
- Baodun culture
  - Jinsha settlement and Sanxingdui mound.
- Çatalhöyük
- Cardium pottery culture
- Comb Ceramic culture
- Corded Ware culture
- Cortaillod culture
- Cucuteni-Trypillian culture
- Dadiwan culture
- Dawenkou culture
- Daxi culture
  - Chengtoushan settlement
- Dapenkeng culture (Taiwan, 4000–3000 BC)
- Grooved ware people
  - Skara Brae, et al.
- Erlitou culture
  - Xia dynasty
- Ertebølle culture
- Hembury culture
- Hemudu culture
- Hongshan culture
- Houli culture
- Horgen culture
- Jeitun culture
- Kura–Araxes culture
- Liangzhu culture
- Linear Pottery culture
  - Goseck circle, Circular ditches, et al.
- Longshan culture
- Majiabang culture
- Majiayao culture
- Peiligang culture
- Pengtoushan culture
- Pfyn culture
- Precucuteni culture
- Qujialing culture
- Shijiahe culture
- Trypillian culture
- Vinča culture
- Lengyel culture (Central Europe, 5000–3400 BC)
- Varna culture (South/Eastern Europe 4400–4100 BC)
- Windmill Hill culture
  - Stonehenge
- Xinglongwa culture
  - Beifudi site
- Xinle culture
- Yangshao culture
  - Banpo and Xishuipo settlements.
- Zhaobaogou culture

Later Neolithic
Periodization: 6500–4500 BC; Europe: 5000–3000 BC; Elsewhere: varies greatly, depending on region.

- Pottery Neolithic (Fertile Crescent, 6400–4500 BC)
  - Halaf culture (Mesopotamia, 6100 BC and 5100 BC)
  - Halaf-Ubaid Transitional period (Mesopotamia, 5500–5000 BC)
  - Ubaid 1/2 (5400–4500 BC)
- Funnelbeaker culture (North/Eastern Europe, 4300–2800 BC)

Chalcolithic

Periodization: Near East: 6000–3500 BC; Europe: 5000–2000 BC; Elsewhere: varies greatly, depending on region. In the Americas, the Chalcolithic ended as late as the 19th century AD for some peoples.

- Ubaid 3/4 (Mesopotamia, 4500–4000 BC)
- early Uruk period (Mesopotamia, 4000–3800 BC)
- middle Uruk period (Mesopotamia, 3800–3400 BC)
- late Trypillian (Eastern Europe, 3000–2750 BC)
- Gaudo Culture (Italy, 3150–2950 BC)
- Corded Ware culture (North/Eastern Europe, 2900–2350 BC)
- Beaker culture (Central/Western Europe, 2900–1800 BC)

== See also ==
- Céide Fields
- Neolithic religion
- Neolithic tomb
- Ötzi
- Rock art of the Djelfa region
- Tabon Man
- Two layer hypothesis
- Neolithic in China
- Neolithic in the Near East
