= Hashbai =

Archaeological site in Lebanon

- Tell Hashbai
- Type: Tell
- Periods: PPNB, Neolithic
- Location: Beqaa Valley, Lebanon
- Part of: Settlement

History
- Built: c. 8200-6200 BC

Site notes
- Excavation dates: 1965-1966
- Archaeologists: Lorraine Copeland, Peter J. Wescombe, Henri de Contenson
- Condition: ruins
- Public access: Yes

Hashbai or Tell Hashbai is an archaeological site on the west of the Beqaa Valley in Lebanon.

The area is watered by the Mount Lebanon reservoirs and sits beside the Wadi Hashbai, close to the Ain Hashbai springs. The site is located on the side of the valley as older sites in the central valley have been deeply covered in soil.

It was first surveyed and studied in 1965-6 by Lorraine Copeland, Peter Wescombe and Henri de Contenson. Materials found included burnished, red-washed shards of pottery (some with incision decoration), arrowheads, sickle blades with coarse denticulation, obsidian, basalt rubber and a limestone pestle. suggested PPNB or Neolithic dating similar to Tell Ramad, Byblos or Amuq with occupation as late as the Bronze Age. A dark brown and black flint group of later appearance was also detected. It was suggested that if this flint group were to belong with the production period for Dark Faced Burnished Ware or red-washed pottery, then it may carry an even earlier PPNB date. Along with evidence from White Ware in the area, this has suggested that the Beqaa sites are of a sub-group suggested to date earlier chronologically than finds from Byblos.
