= Bouqras =

Neolithic tell in Syria

- Location within Near East Location within Syria
- 35.085274°N 40.397445°E
- Type: Tell
- Periods: PPNA, PPNB, Neolithic
- Location: 35 km (22 mi) southeast of Deir ez-Zor, Syria
- Region: Euphrates
- Part of: Village

History
- Built: c. 7400
- Abandoned: c. 6200 BC

Site notes
- Material: bones, flints, pottery, plaster
- Length: 250 metres (820 ft)
- Width: 100 metres (330 ft)
- Area: 5 hectares (540,000 ft^{2})
- Excavation dates: 1960-1965; 1976-1978
- Archaeologists: Henri de Contenson; Willem J. van Liere; Peter Akkermans; Maurits van Loon; J. J. Roodenberg; H. T. Waterbolk
- Condition: Ruins
- Management: Directorate-General of Antiquities and Museums
- Public access: Yes

Bouqras is a large, oval shaped, prehistoric, Neolithic Tell, about 5 hectares (540,000 ft^{2}) in size, located around 35 kilometres (22 mi) from Deir ez-Zor in Syria.

== Excavation ==
The tell was discovered in 1960 by Dutch geomorphologist, Willem van Liere. It was excavated between 1960 and 1965 by Henri de Contenson and van Liere and later between 1976 and 1978 by Peter Akkermans, Maurits van Loon, J. J. Roodenberg and H. T. Waterbolk.

== Construction ==
The mound was found to be approximately 4.5 metres (15 ft) deep and showed evidence of 11 periods of occupation spread over at least 1000 years between ca. 7400 and 6200 BC. The earliest levels, 11 to 8, showed early Neolithic aceramic occupation developing on to stages with pottery in levels 7 to 1, from which over 7000 sherds were recovered. Material from later levels was visible on the surface when first discovered. The layout and arrangement of houses seems to have been well ordered with similar arrangements of rooms, entrances, hearths and other features. Houses were made of mud bricks and generally rectangular with three or four rooms.

== Culture ==
Bouqras seems to have developed in comparative isolation with few other settlements near the area. Interiors of the buildings featured white plastered walls with occasional use of red ochre for decoration with some images of birds. By later stages of the settlement, it was likely inhabited by as many as 700 to 1000 villagers. Large quantities of obsidian was found suggesting links with Anatolia. A distinctive group of limestone, alabaster and gypsum vessels was also found made from local materials. Rounded or cylindrical beads were also found made of bone, shell, greenstones, carnelian and dentalium. An alabaster bracelet fragment and pendant were recovered as forms of personal decoration. Several stone stamp seals including one of alabaster and one of jadeite were found with incised rectilinear patterns along with a few clay figurines. Pottery started to be found from the third level of habitation including a white plaster vessel. Other materials were varied with coarse and fine sherds made with mixed straw and sand. Some sherds were burnished or painted red, one with a triangle on it. Arrowheads recovered included Byblos points and two types of Amuq points along with two other distinctive designs. Flints were usually of a fine dark grey or brown type found locally.

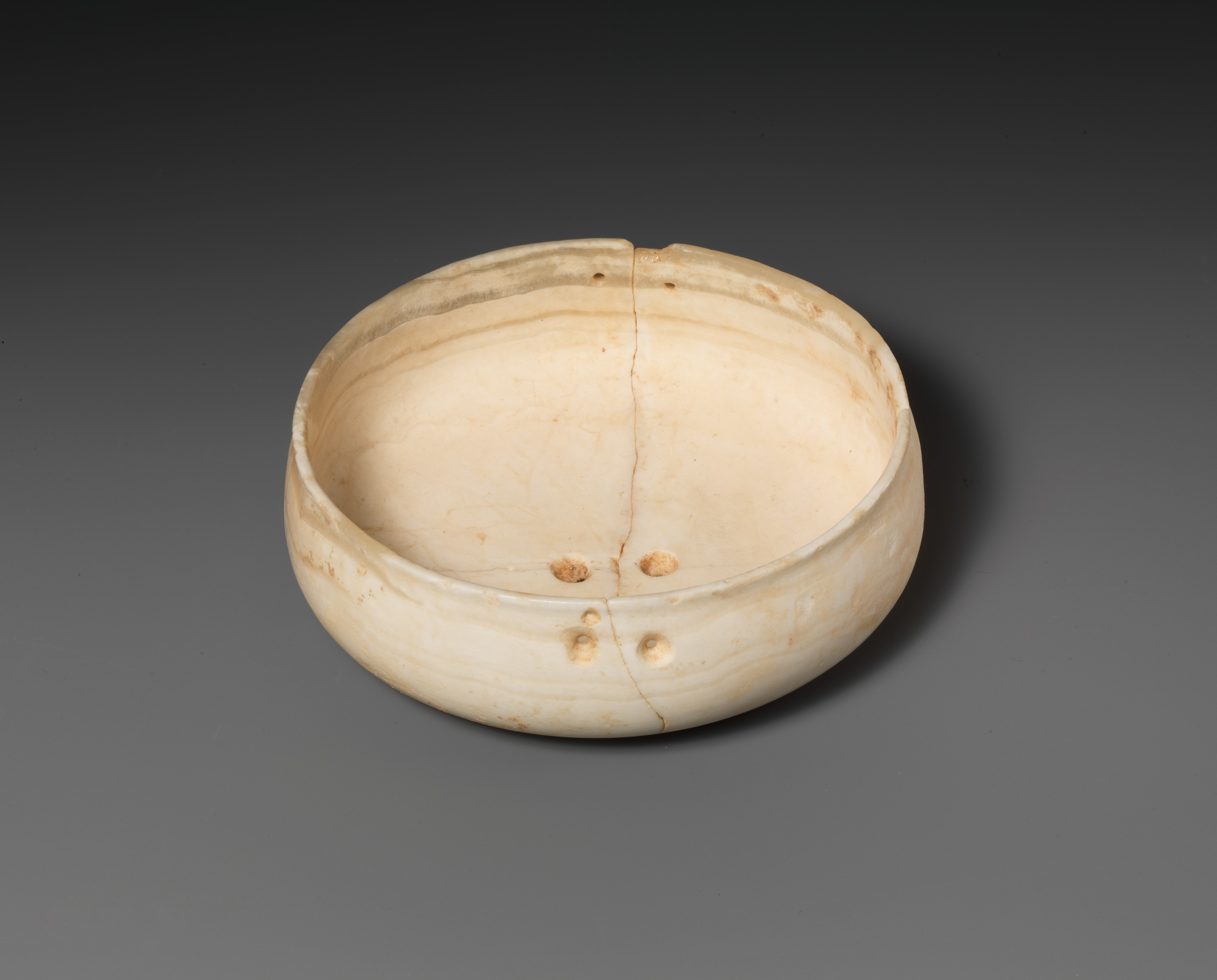
Stone Bowl, Syria, probably Bouqras, ca. late 8th millennium BC.

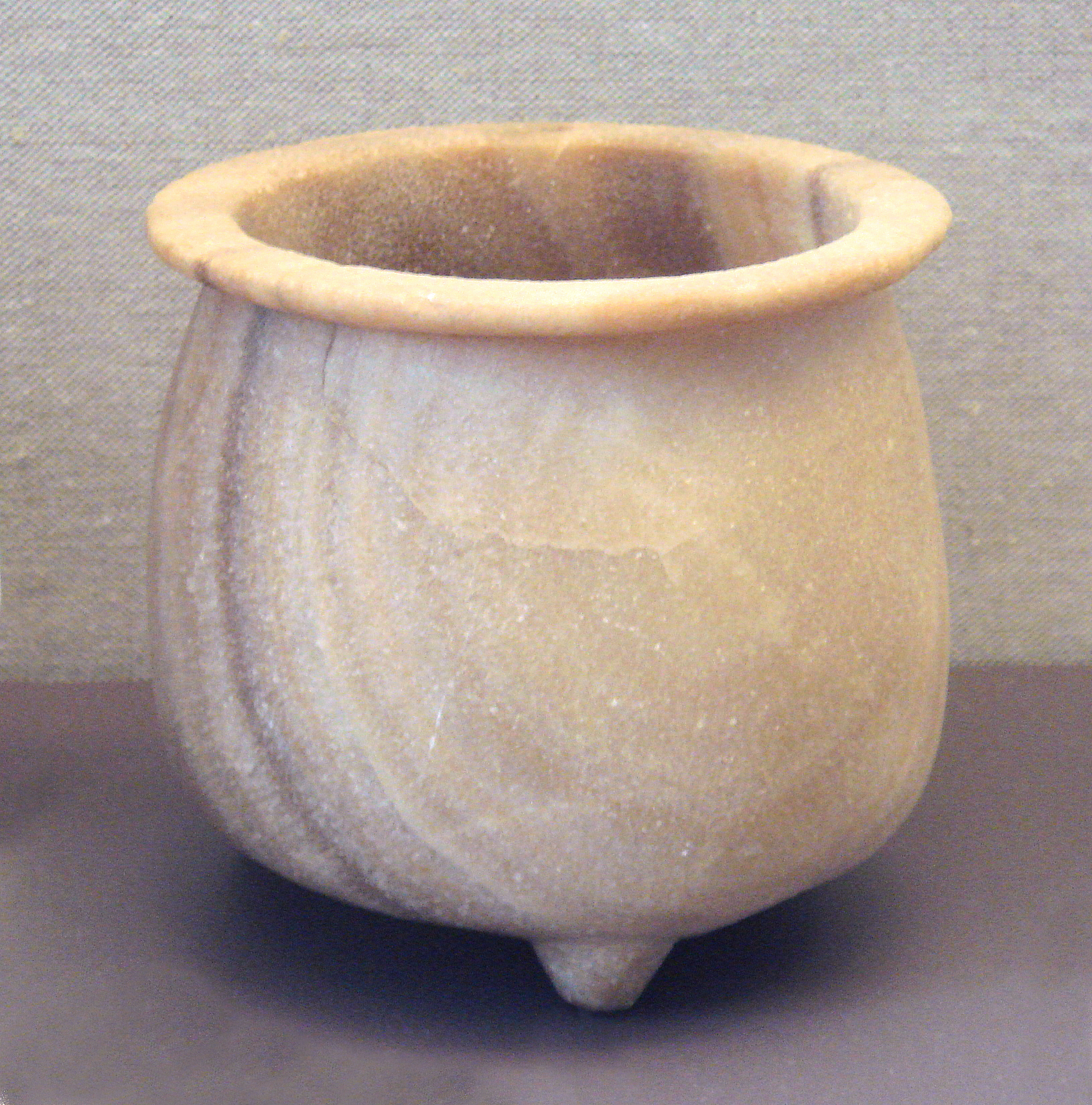
Calcite tripod vase, mid-Euphrates, probably from Tell Buqras, 6000 BC, Louvre Museum AO 31551

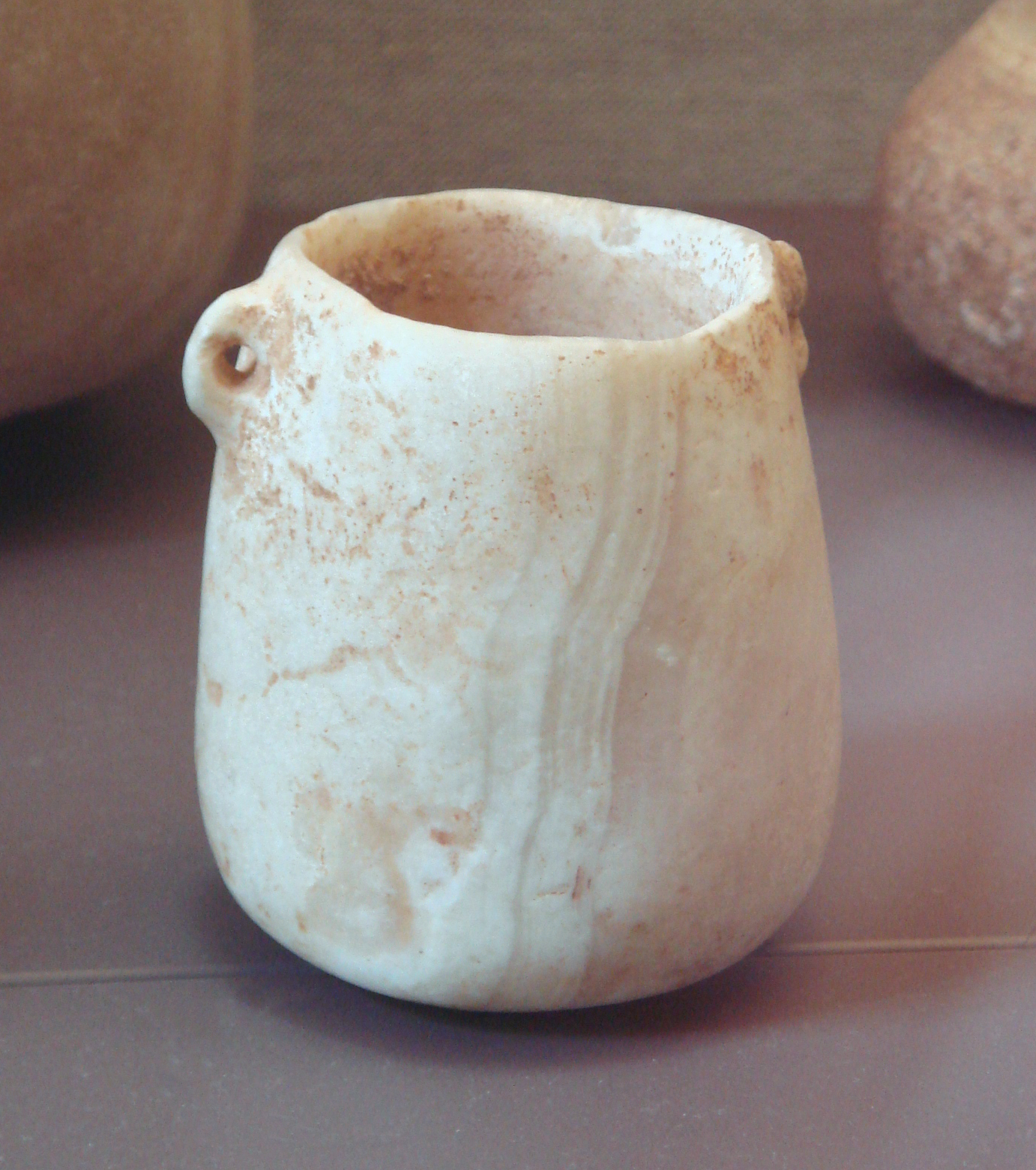
Alabaster pot with handles, Buqras region, 6500 BCE Louvre Museum AO 28519

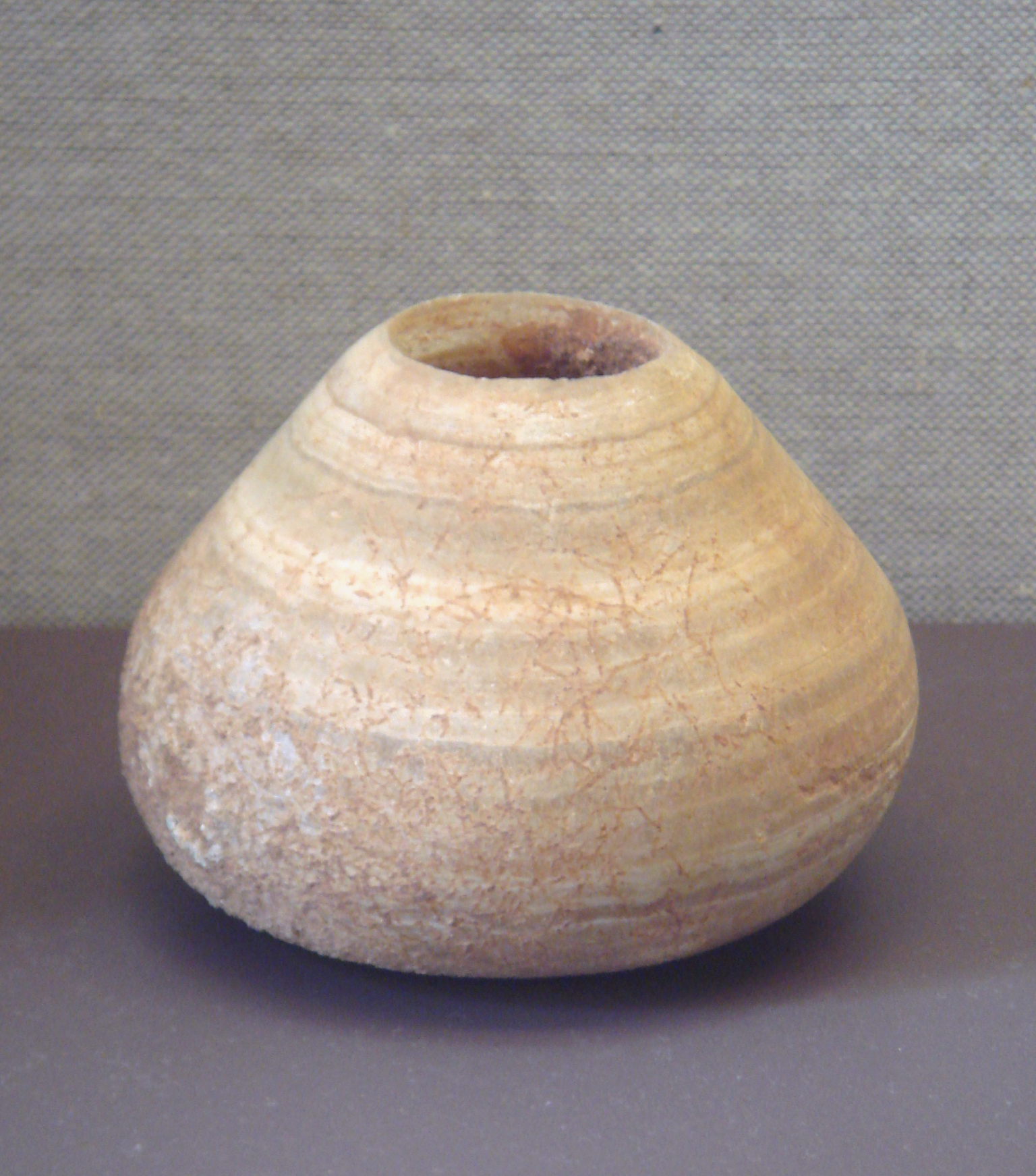
Alabaster pot Mid-Euphrates region, 6500 BC, Louvre Museum

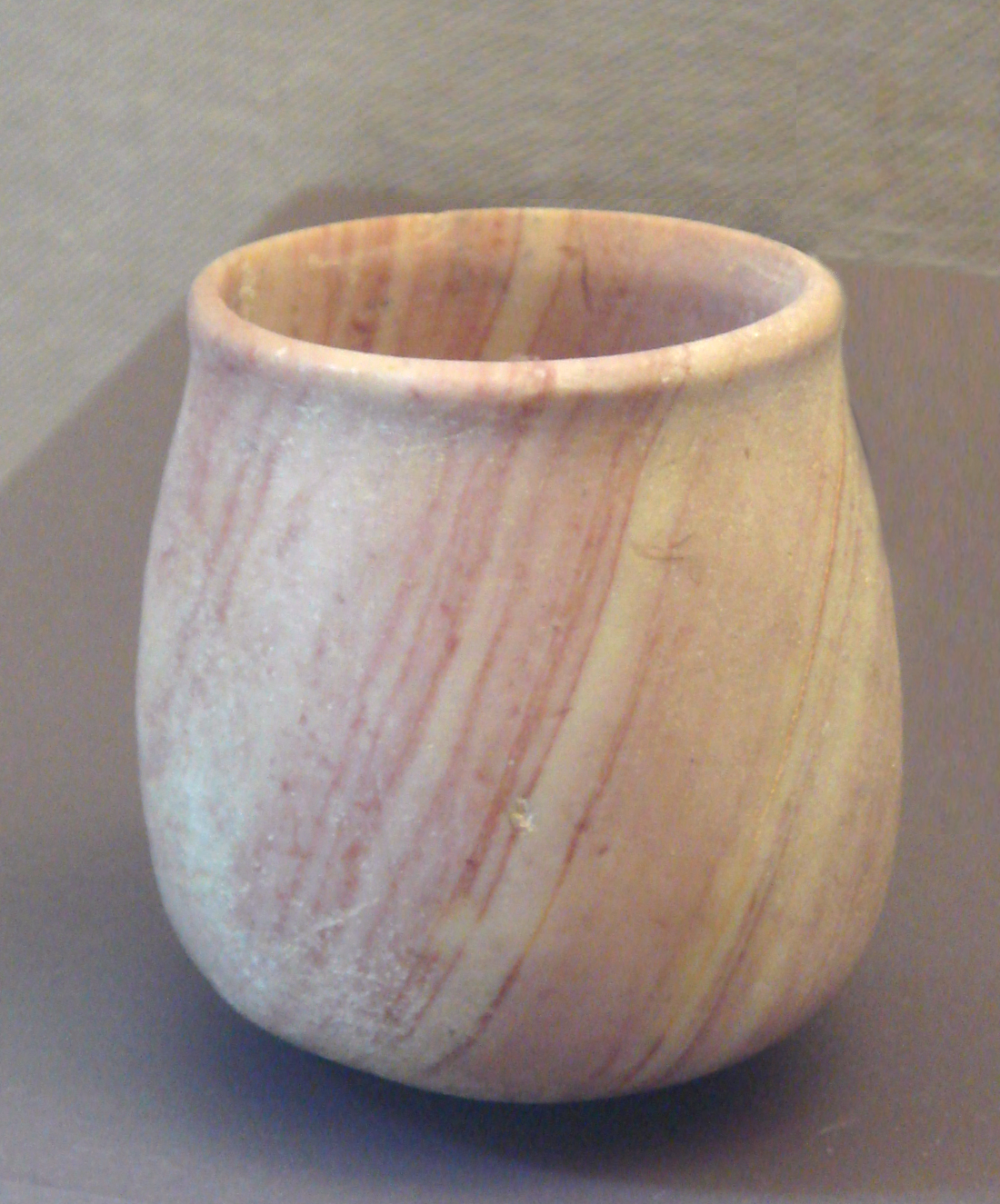
Alabaster pot, Mid-Euphrates region, 6500 BC, Louvre Museum

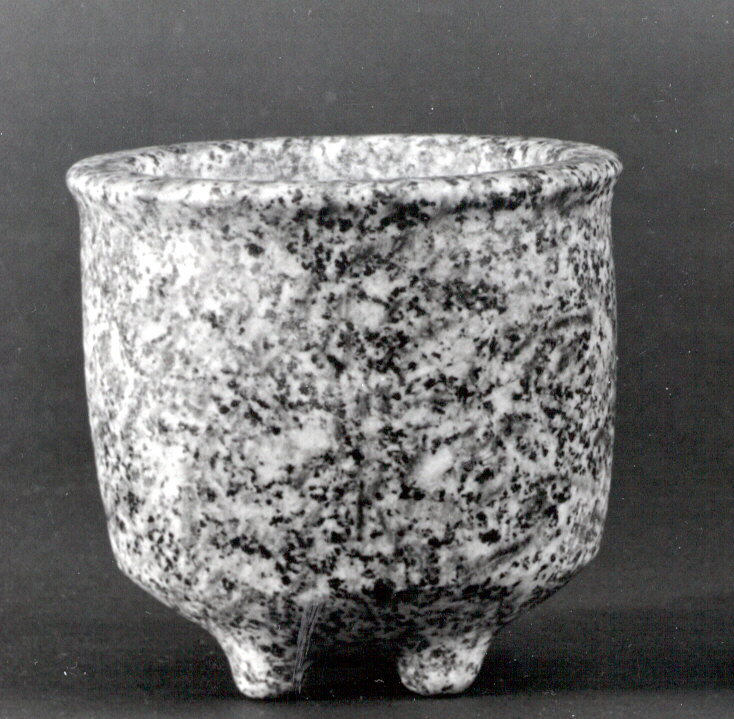
Footed bowl in granite, Syria, end of 8th millennium BC.

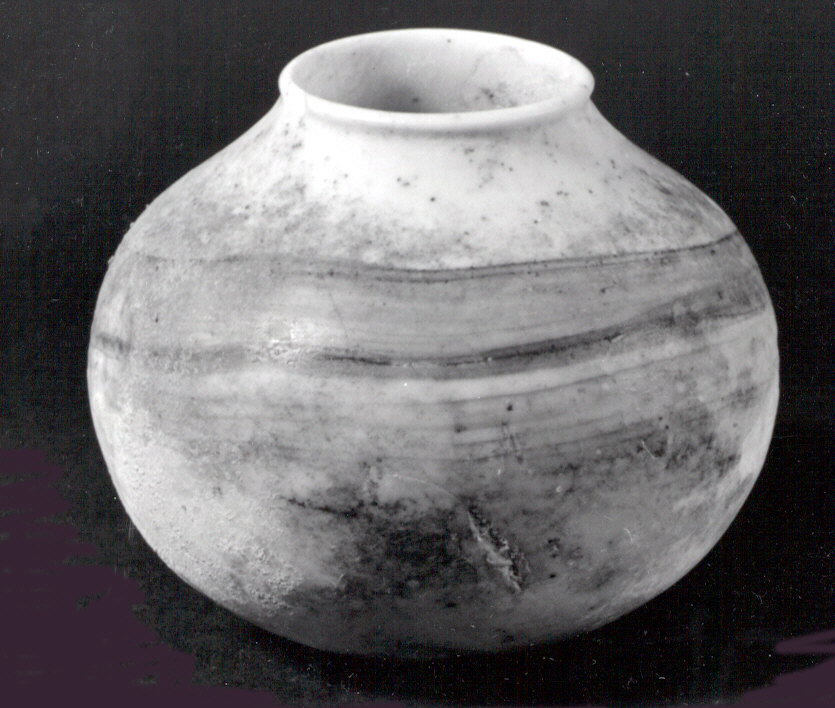
Jar in calcite alabaster, Syria, late 8th millennium BC.

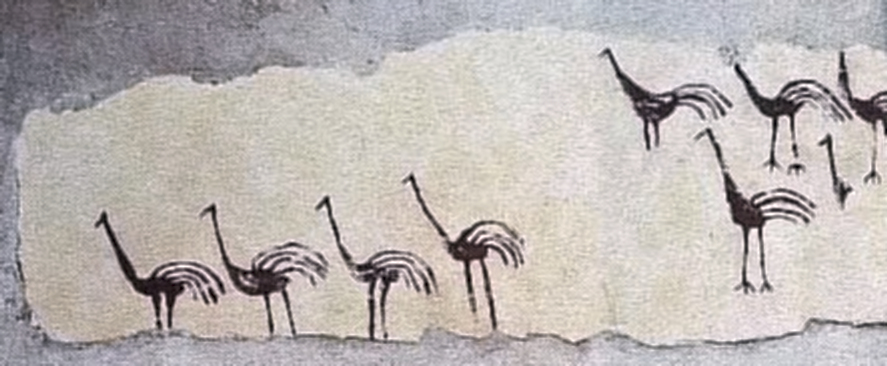
Wall painting in a Neolithic house in Tell Bouqras. Deir ez-Zor Museum (copy).

== Agriculture and animal domestication ==
Paleobotanical studies were carried out by Willem van Zeist on carbonized plant remains recovered via water flotation. This has shown rain fed agriculture was practiced at Bouqras including cultivation of Emmer, Einkorn and free-threshing wheat, naked and hulled barley, peas and lentils. Sickle blades, querns and pounders appear in the early stages at Bouqras, but not in later stages. White Ware was found suggested to have been used as basket covering to make them impermeable.

Sheep and goat comprised approximately 80% of the 5800 identifiable fragments of animal remains found. Other fauna included pigs and cattle, the domestication of which is uncertain. Deer, gazelle and onager were also hunted.
