= Tjalling Waterbolk =

Dutch archaeologist (1924–2020)

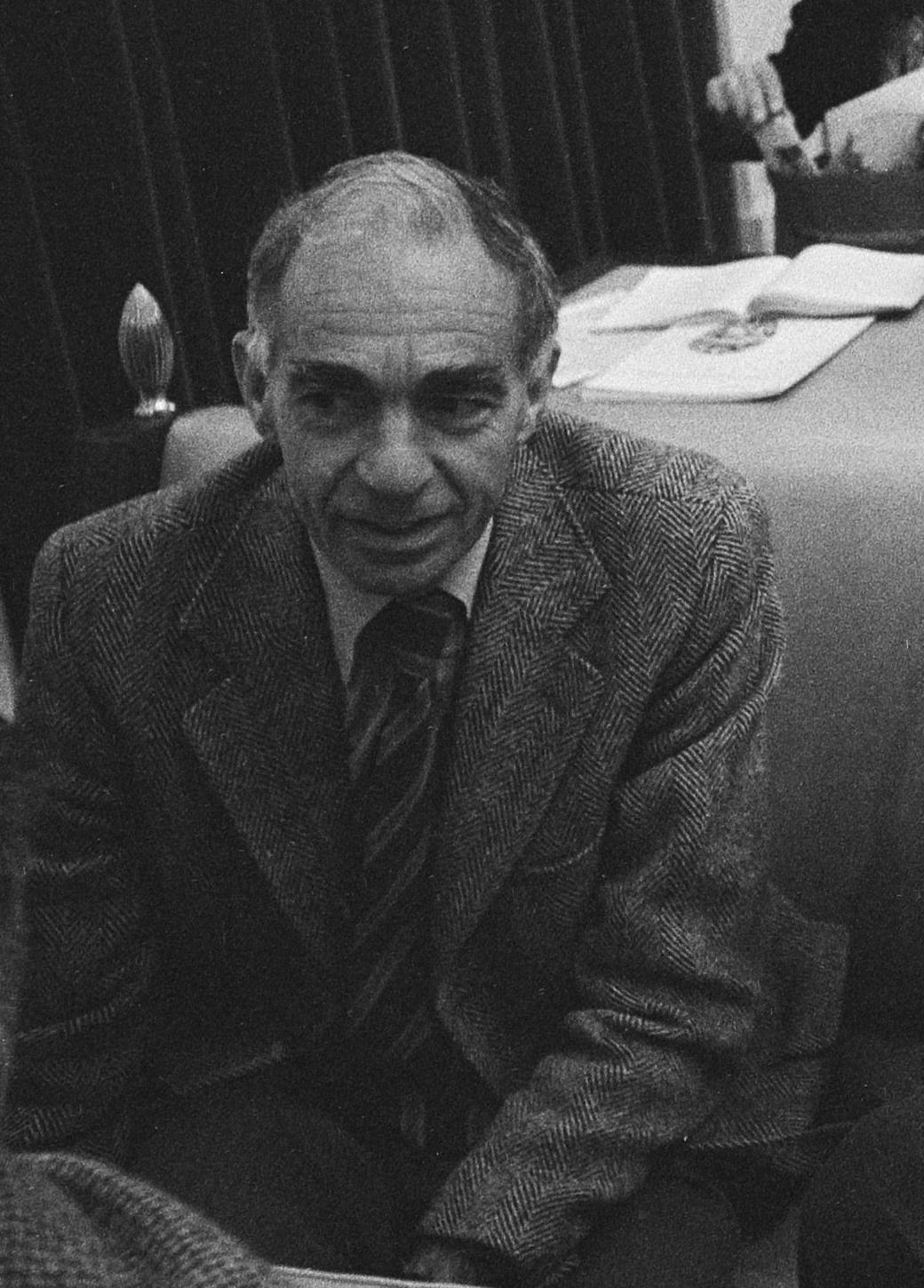
- Tjalling Waterbolk (1978)
- Born: Harm Tjalling Waterbolk; 18 May 1924; Havelte, Netherlands
- Died: 27 September 2020 (aged 96); Haren, Groningen, Netherlands
- Occupation: Archaeologist

Academic background
- Education: University of Groningen
- Thesis: De praehistorische mens en zijn milieu : een palynologisch onderzoek naar de menselijke invloed op de plantengroei van de diluviale gronden in Nederland (1954)
- Influences: Victor Westhoff, Albert Egges van Giffen

Academic work
- Institutions: University of Groningen

Harm Tjalling "Tjalling" Waterbolk (18 May 1924 – 27 September 2020) was a Dutch archaeologist. He was a professor of archaeology and director of the Biological-Archaeological Institute at the University of Groningen between 1954 and 1987.

Waterbolk was known for his interdisciplinary approach and combined his work in archaeology with insights in nature and landscapes. He worked in a wide variety of countries, but had special interest in the Northern part of the Netherlands and especially his home province of Drenthe.

== Early life ==
Waterbolk was born on 18 May 1924 in Havelte. His father Albert was the municipal clerk (Dutch: gemeentesecretaris) of Havelte. From an early age Waterbolk had an interest in nature, with this interest being supported by his parents, teachers and townspeople of Havelte. In 1942 he became a member of the Nederlandse Jeugdbond voor Natuur during his youth, which further strengthened his interest in nature. Waterbolk attended the University of Groningen to study biology and later botany. During this period he familiarized himself with phytosociology through mentor Victor Westhoff. Only in 1945 he became familiarized with archaeology when he met Albert Egges van Giffen, who was looking for someone with knowledge of palynology. Waterbolk would work as an assistant for Van Giffen between 1945 and 1951. In 1946 he performed his first excavation, in his home town of Havelte. Since Waterbolk had signed the Loyaliteitsverklaring during World War II, he was prevented from taking exams until 1948. In 1949 he spent half a year with Danish palaeoecologist Johannes Iversen. Waterbolk worked for the Bataafse Petroleum Maatschappij between 1951 and 1954. He obtained his doctorate at the University of Groningen in 1954 with a thesis titled: De praehistorische mens en zijn milieu : een palynologisch onderzoek naar de menselijke invloed op de plantengroei van de diluviale gronden in Nederland.

== Career and research ==
After obtaining his PhD Waterbolk was appointed professor of archaeology at the University of Groningen the same year and he succeeded Albert Egges van Giffen in this position. He had a teaching assignment in Prehistoric and Germanic archaeology. Apart from being professor Waterbolk also served as director of the Biological-Archaeological Institute of the University. He retired in 1987. After retiring Waterbolk made a further 120 academic publications.

Waterbolk's archaeological work spanned a period between the prehistory and the Middle Ages. He had influence in the development and usage of radiocarbon dating and palynology in the Netherlands. During his career he performed excavations in the Netherlands, Switzerland, Syria (Bouqras), Serbia (Vojvodina) and Turkey. He had a special interest in the Northern Netherlands and the province of Drenthe where he led excavations in Odoorn, Elp and Gasselte. He looked intensively into the spread of agriculture in societies. Waterbolk also had an academic interest in house plans and cultural landscapes. In his works he combined geology, soil science, biology, physical and historical geography. Waterbolk was considered as one of the most eminent post-World War II archaeologists of the Netherlands, having shaped archaeology in the Netherlands together with Willem Glasbergen and Pieter J.R. Modderman.

Waterbolk was elected a member of the Royal Netherlands Academy of Arts and Sciences in 1970.

=== Tjerk Vermaning case ===
Waterbolk was known for his involvement in surfacing the archaeological forgery case of Tjerk Vermaning of the 1960s and 1970s. In the 1960s Vermaning stated that he had found stone tools, which were dated back to thousands of years by Waterbolk. In 1973 Waterbolk still applauded Vermaning for his discoveries while his assistant, Dick Stapert, was performing his doctoral studies on the findings of Vermaning. However, in 1975 Stapert concluded that they were forgeries. Vermaning was subsequently prosecuted for forgery and fraud. He was first convicted and on appeal acquitted.

The case caused a deterioration in the relations between academic and amateur archaeologists in the Northern Netherlands and led to death threats against Waterbolk and Stapert. It also did not leave Waterbolk without criticism, especially whether he could have surfaced the forgeries at an earlier stage. Even after retiring Waterbolk tried to clear-up the details of the case and in 2003 wrote the book Scherpe stenen op mijn pad about his views on the case.

== Personal life ==
In 2015 the book Werk van Eeuwen by Jos Bazelmans en Jan Kolen, describing conversations with Waterbolk was published. In 2019, at age 95, he published his autobiography, Veranderend leven.

Waterbolk was married to a botanical analyst, he met his wife at the Nederlandse Jeugdbond voor Natuur. He once stated that the most beautiful thing he ever dug up was his wife. Waterbolk was an honorary member of Het Drentse Landschap.

Waterbolk died on 27 September 2020 in Haren, Groningen, aged 96.
