= Tell Ghoraifé =

- تل غريفة (Arabic)
- Location within Syria
- 33.532°N 36.531°E
- Type: tell
- Periods: PPNB, Neolithic
- Location: 22 km (14 mi) east of Damascus, Syria
- Region: Damascus basin
- Part of: village

History
- Built: c. 7870–5840 BC

Site notes
- Material: clay, limestone
- Area: 5 hectares (540,000 ft^{2})
- Excavation dates: 1974
- Archaeologists: Henri de Contenson
- Condition: ruins
- Management: Directorate-General of Antiquities and Museums
- Public access: Yes

Tell Ghoraifé (Arabic: تل غريفة) is a prehistoric, Neolithic tell, about 22 kilometres (14 mi) east of Damascus, Syria. The tell was the site of a small village of 5 hectares (540,000 ft^{2}), which was first settled in the early eighth millennium BC.

A small, 2 square metres (22 ft^{2}) excavation was made on the tell by Henri de Contenson in 1974.

Materials discovered, particularly the stylistic traits of the lithic tools, show similarities with Southern Levantine Pre-Pottery Neolithic A and Pre-Pottery Neolithic B sites. Tell Ghoraifé is closely related other Neolithic sites in the Damascus basin, like Tell Aswad and Tell Ramad. Despite the similarities these sites share with Euphrates valley sites such as building materials, pre-pottery White Ware and burial rites, they represent a separate, distinct group from the Euphrates valley.

Tell Ghoraifé is an important site to our understanding of the origin of agriculture. It is an example of a site with a long sequence over a millennium where the study of the evolution from wild to domesticated barley has taken place. Finds also included early domesticated wheat.

== Literature ==
- de Contenson, H., Bibliothèque archéologique et historique 137 Aswad et Ghoraifé : sites néolithiques en Damascène (Syrie) aux IXème et VIIIème millénaires avant l'ère chrétienne, Bibliothèque Archéologique et Historique, 137, Beirut, 1995
- van Zeist, W. Bakker-Heeres, J.A.H., Archaeobotanical Studies in the Levant 1. Neolithic Sites in the Damascus Basin: Aswad, Ghoraifé, Ramad - Palaeohistoria, 24, 165-256, 1982.
