= Ramad =

Ramad may refer to:

- Ar Ramad, a village in western central Yemen.
- Tell Ramad, a prehistoric, Neolithic tell at the foot of Mount Hermon, about 20 kilometres (12 mi) southwest of Damascus in Syria
