= Cafer Höyük =

Archaeological site in Turkey

- Cafer Hoyuk
- Location within Turkey
- 38.4166°N 38.75°E
- Type: Tell
- Cultures: Paleolithic, PPNB, Neolithic, Bronze Age, Medieval

History
- Built: 8920 - 7110 BCE

Site notes
- Excavation dates: 1979-1986
- Archaeologists: Jacques Cauvin
- Public access: yes

Cafer Hoyuk or Cafer Höyük is an archaeological site located around 40 kilometres (25 mi) northeast of Malatya, Turkey in the Euphrates valley. It was inhabited over ten thousand years ago during the Neolithic Revolution.

== Settlement ==
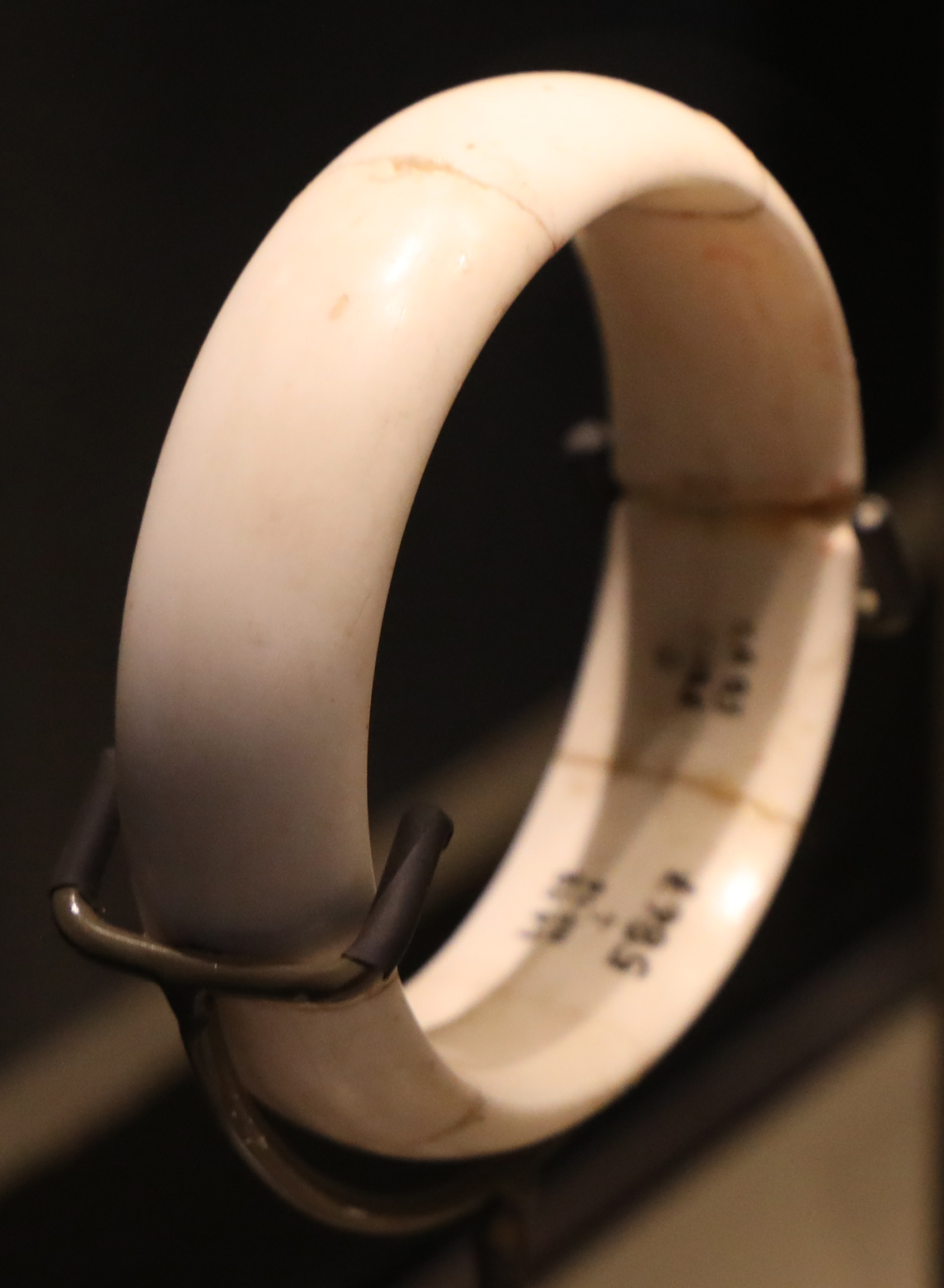
Neolithic ivory bracelet, Cafer Höyük

Construction of the Karakaya Dam has flooded the northeast of the tell mound. Rescue excavations were carried out by the French National Scientific Research Centre (CNRS) under Jacques Cauvin between 1979 and 1986. Finds at the site were dated to the Paleolithic, Pre-Pottery Neolithic, Pottery Neolithic, Early Bronze Age along with a few Medieval finds. Building techniques at the site were seen to be similar to those used at Cayonu with a rectangular mud-brick structures with three rooms called by Cauvin the "cell-plan" phase. Engravings of the shoulders of bulls on the walls of a house were indicative of animalism similar to that found at Çatalhöyük. The first evidence of domesticated cereals appears shortly before this stage. Livestock farming was not evidenced at this level but developed later in the PPNB. Features of the tell mound have been suggested to indicate male and female fertility features. Votive figurines were also found during excavations that were suggested to be male Gods.

The "old period" of the settlement shows a predominant use of flint for tools but in the "middle period" obsidian becomes increasingly prevalent. The "new period" evidences use of around 90% obsidian. Skeletons were also unearthed including those of two children. A skeleton of a pet dog was found evidencing hunting of rabbits along with larger animals in the first stage such as wild boar, roe deer, foxes and other prey. Sheep and goats are both hunted and a very small number of bear and panther bones were also discovered. Findings indicated that larger prey was hunted in later stages.

Wild emmer and einkorn wheat were found in the first layers of excavation. Wheat, barley, lentils and peas were found cultivated along with wild varieties in later levels. Silos for storing grain were also found at these levels. The first layers of the excavations showed evidence of wild emmer and einkorn wheat. It was shown from the findings that these two cereals were taken into cultivation first, followed by the lentils, peas and vetch and afterwards barley. This evidence led Willem van Zeist to suggest that domesticated crops did not enter the area around the Taurus Mountains and Northern Syria until the middle of the PPNB.

Cauvin drew detailed designs of the various settlement construction phases and dated the "old period" to the Pre-Pottery Neolithic B with c14 dates of around 8450-7180 BCE. More recent calibrations have pushed the dating of the earliest levels back as far as 8920 BCE.

== See also ==
- Cities of the ancient Near East
