= Tjerk Vermaning =

Dutch amateur archaeologist and forger

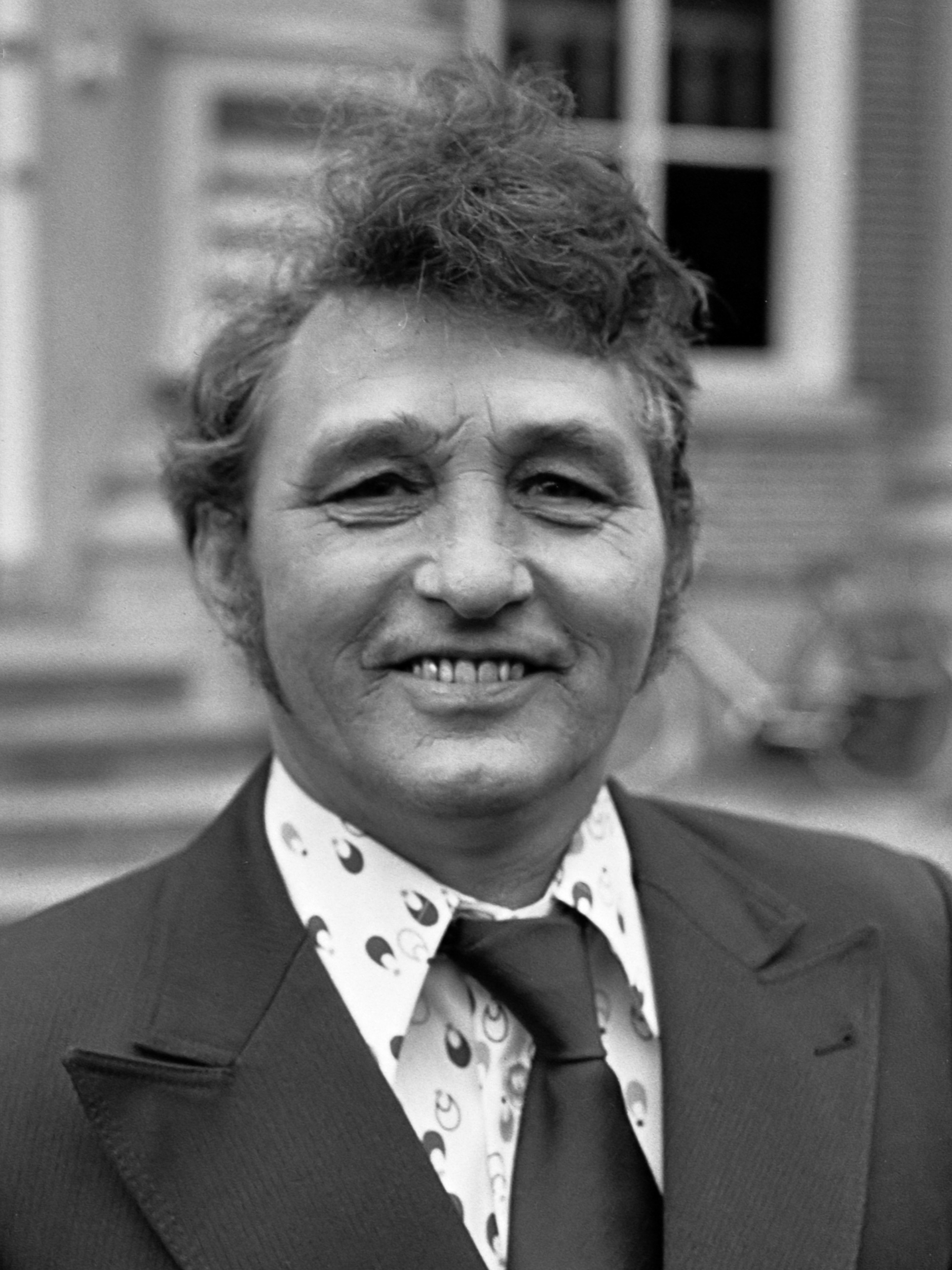
Tjerk Vermaning (1977)

Tjerk Vermaning (1929, Staphorst, Overijssel – 1986, Assen) was a Dutch amateur archaeologist who is now mostly remembered for the court case and media frenzy that followed the assessment of professional archaeologists that he had forged certain of his prehistoric archaeological 'finds'.

Before the forgery came out Tjerk Vermaning was a well-respected collector who in 1966 received the Cultural Prize of Drenthe for his contributions to furthering the understanding of the prehistoric heritage of the province. On 18 March 1975, however, he was arrested on a forgery charge. The accusations were made by the province of Drenthe, based on the findings of archeologists professor Tjalling Waterbolk and his associate Dick Stapert of the University of Groningen. An arduous court case followed, in which several well-known Dutch and European professional archaeologists (including German archaeologist Gerhard Bosinski) supported the accusations. Several amateur archaeologists, on the other hand, were convinced of Vermaning's innocence and mounted their own campaign to get him acquitted. Vermaning was initially found guilty of fraud and was sentenced to one month in prison in 1977, but he appealed the verdict. In 1978 Vermaning was acquitted on appeal because it had not been proven, in the eyes of the judge, that he had himself forged the artefacts in question.

Despite Vermaning's acquittal, consensus among professional archaeologists was and is that the artefacts are not authentic. Vermaning felt that as a result of the court case his integrity had been shattered, and he remained bitter about the affair and resentful toward academic archaeology for the rest of his life. For years or even decades the Vermaning affair strained the relations between Dutch amateur and professional archaeologists, especially in the northern region where Vermaning had been active.

== Publications ==
- (in Dutch) Sanden, Wijnand van der, Schuring, Anja, 2018. De zaak Vermaning. Over een markant amateurarcheoloog in Drenthe. Assen, Drents Museum, 2018. ISBN 9789462582729
- Stapert, D., 1982. A middle Palaeolithic artefact scatter, and a few younger finds from near Mander NW of Ootmarsum (Province of Overijssel, the Netherlands). Palaeohistoria, 24: 29–31.
- J.D. van der Waals & H.T. Waterbolk: 'The middle palaeolithic finds from Hogersmilde'. In: Palaeohistoria. XV, 1973, p. 35-120
- The history about tjerk vermaning 2023:
