= White Ware =

Type of limestone plaster

White Ware or "Vaisselle Blanche", effectively a form of limestone plaster used to make vessels, is the first precursor to clay pottery developed in the Levant that appeared in the 9th millennium BC, during the pre-pottery (aceramic) neolithic period. It is not to be confused with "whiteware", which is both a term in the modern ceramic industry for most finer types of pottery for tableware and similar uses, and a term for specific historical types of earthenware made with clays giving an off-white body when fired.

== History ==
White Ware was commonly found in PPNB archaeological sites in Syria such as Tell Aswad, Tell Abu Hureyra, Bouqras and El Kowm. Similar sherds were excavated at 'Ain Ghazal in northern Jordan. White pozzolanic ware from Tell Ramad and Ras Shamra is considered to be a local imitation of these limestone vessels. It was also evident in the earliest neolithic periods of Byblos, Hashbai, Labweh, Tell Jisr and Tell Neba'a Faour in the Beqaa Valley, Lebanon. It has been noted that this type of pottery was more prevalent and dated earlier in the Beqaa than at Byblos. A mixed form was found at Byblos where the clay was coated in a limestone slip, in both plain and shell combed finishes. The similarities of White Ware and overlapping time periods with later clay firing methods have suggested that Dark Faced Burnished Ware, the first real pottery, came as a development from this limestone prototype.

== Manufacturing ==
This crumbly form of proto-pottery was manufactured by pulverizing limestone, then heating it to a temperature in excess of 1000 °C. This reduced it to lime which could be mixed with ashes, straw or gravel and made into a white or grey lime plaster. The plaster was initially so soft that it could be moulded, before hardening through air drying into a rigid cement. The plaster was formed into vessels by coiling to serve some of the functions of later clay pottery. White Ware vessels tended to be rather large and coarse, often found in the dwelling rooms where they were made indicating their use for stationary storage of dry goods. Designs included a range of large and heavy rectangular tubs, circular vessels and smaller bowls, cups and jars. Imprints of basketry on the exterior of some vessels suggest that some were shaped into large basket shapes. It is likely these larger vessels were mainly used for dry goods storage. Some of the White Ware vessels found were decorated with incisions and thick stripes of red ochre. Other uses of this material included plastering of skulls and as a floor or wall covering. Some lime plaster floors were also painted red, and a few were found with designs imprinted on them.

== See also ==
- Cement
- Concrete
- Geopolymers
