= Pre-Pottery Neolithic B =

Neolithic culture in upper Mesopotamia and the Levant c. 8800–6500 BC

- Area of the Fertile Crescent, c. 7500 BC, with main Pre-Pottery Neolithic sites. The area of Mesopotamia proper was not fully settled by humans.
- Geographical range: Fertile Crescent
- Period: Pre-Pottery Neolithic
- Dates: c. 10,800–8,500 BP; c. 8800–6500 BC
- Type site: Jericho, Byblos
- Preceded by: Pre-Pottery Neolithic A
- Followed by: Pre-Pottery Neolithic C; Pottery Neolithic; Halaf culture; Hassuna culture; Neolithic Greece; Savanna Pastoral Neolithic; Khirokitia; Yarmukian; Faiyum A culture

Clickable map of the modern-day eastern Mediterranean showing important sites that were occupied in the Pre-Pottery Neolithic B

Pre-Pottery Neolithic B (PPNB) is part of the Pre-Pottery Neolithic, a Neolithic culture centered in upper Mesopotamia and the Levant, dating to c. 10,800 – c. 8,500 years ago, that is, 8800–6500 BC. It was typed by British archaeologist Kathleen Kenyon during her archaeological excavations at Jericho in the West Bank, territory of the State of Palestine.

== Lifestyle ==
Cultural tendencies of this period differ from that of the earlier Pre-Pottery Neolithic A (PPNA), in that people living during this phase began to depend more heavily upon domesticated animals to supplement their earlier mixed agrarian and hunter-gatherer diet. In addition, the flint tool kit of the period is new and quite distinct from that of the earlier period. One of its major elements is the naviform core. This is the first period in which architectural styles of the southern Levant became primarily rectilinear; earlier typical dwellings were circular, elliptical, and occasionally even octagonal. Pyrotechnology, the expanding capability to control fire, was highly developed in this period. During this period, one of the main features of houses is a thick layer of white clay plaster flooring, highly polished and made of lime produced from limestone.

It is believed that the use of clay plaster for floor and wall coverings during PPNB led to the discovery of pottery. The earliest proto-pottery was White Ware vessels, made from lime and gray ash, built up around baskets before firing, for several centuries around 7000 BC at sites such as Tell Neba'a Faour (Beqaa Valley). Sites from this period found in the Levant utilizing rectangular floor plans and plastered floor techniques were found at Ain Ghazal, Yiftahel (western Galilee), and Abu Hureyra (Upper Euphrates). The period is dated to between c. 10,700 and c. 8,000 BP or 8,700–6,000 BC.

Plastered human skulls were reconstructed human skulls that were made in the ancient Levant between 9000 and 6000 BC in the Pre-Pottery Neolithic B period. They represent some of the oldest forms of art in the Middle East and demonstrate that the prehistoric population took great care in burying their ancestors below their homes. The skulls denote some of the earliest sculptural examples of portraiture in the history of art.

== Society ==
Danielle Stordeur's recent work at Tell Aswad, a large agricultural village between Mount Hermon and Damascus could not validate Henri de Contenson's earlier suggestion of a PPNA Aswadian culture. Instead, they found evidence of a fully established PPNB culture at 8700 BC at Aswad, pushing back the period's generally accepted start date by 1,200 years. Similar sites to Tell Aswad in the Damascus Basin of the same age were found at Tell Ramad and Tell Ghoraifé. How a PPNB culture could spring up in this location, practicing domesticated farming from 8700 BC, has been the subject of speculation. Whether it created its own culture or imported traditions from the Northeast or Southern Levant has been considered an important question for a site that poses a problem for the scientific community.

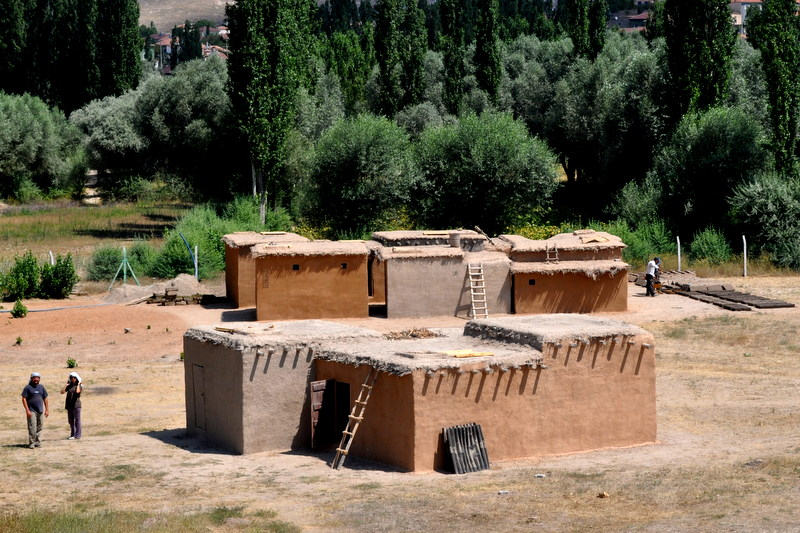
Reconstitution of housing in Aşıklı Höyük, modern Turkey

== Domestication of animals ==
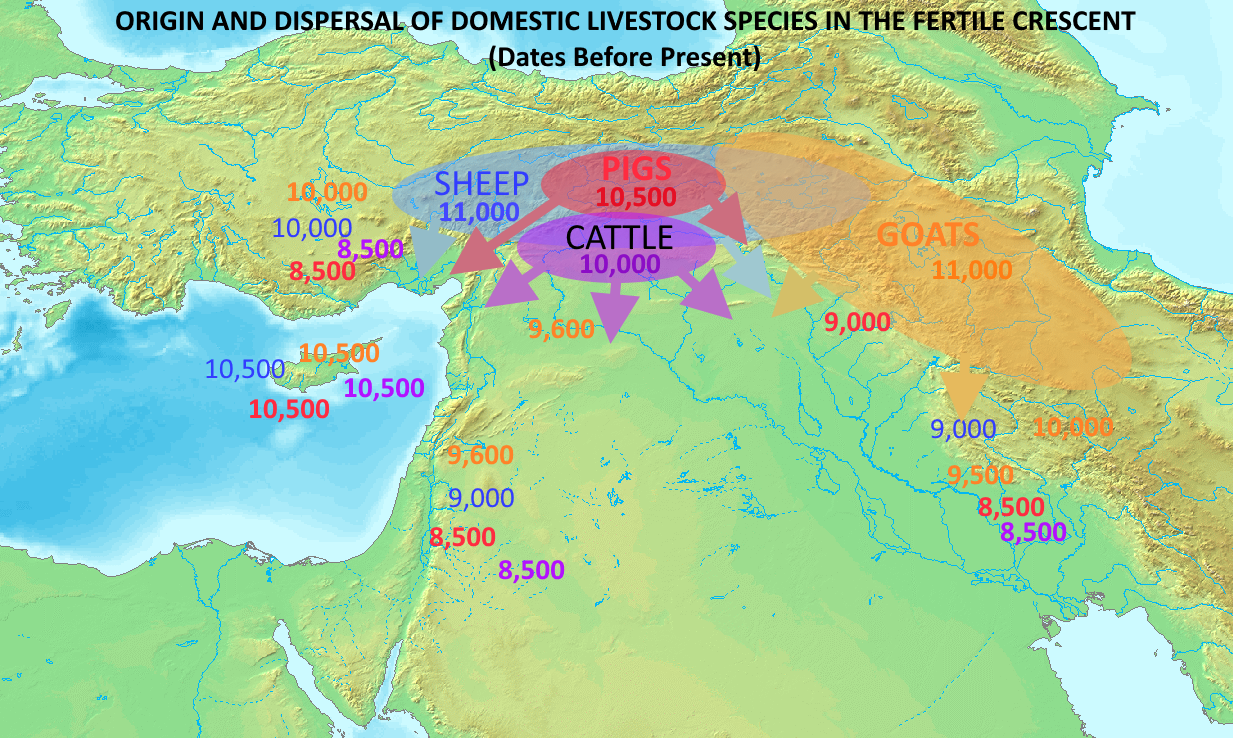
Origin and dispersal of domestic livestock species in the Fertile Crescent (dates Before Present).

The first Pre-Pottery Neolithic A societies, such as the Taş Tepeler culture had not yet developed the herding of animals or agriculture: their subsistence depended on hunting and selective harvesting of wild cereal grasses. There have been no findings of domesticated species of plant or animals at Göbekli Tepe or Karahan Tepe, some of the two most important Taş Tepeler sites. But initial efforts towards the domestication of animals seems to have started there, such as early efforts at animal management, especially symbolic representations and entrapment methods. The earliest dates for the actual domestication of animals are c. 9000 BCE for goats and sheep, c. 8500 BCE for pigs, and c. 8000 BCE for cattle, all in the area of Northern Mesopotamia. Çayönü Tepe for example, a typical Pre-Pottery Neolithic B site, may be where some of the first animal domestication occurred, as the pig may have first been domesticated there in 8,500 BCE.

Sites such as Çayönü Tepe developed from the cultural tradition of Gobekli Tepe, and started to implement agriculture from the 9th millennium BCE, as well as other sites such as Neva Çori or Cafer Höyük, Hallan Çemi, Abu Hureyra and Jerf al Amar.

== Crop cultivation and granaries ==
Location of identified foci of cereal domestication in the Near East: pre-domestic agriculture (italics) and morphological domestication (right). Ohalo II is a hypothetical early-stage developer.

Sedentism of this time allowed for the cultivation of local grains, such as barley and wild oats, and for storage in granaries. Sites such as Dhra′ and Jericho retained a hunting lifestyle until the PPNB period, but granaries allowed for year-round occupation.

This period of cultivation is considered "pre-domestication", but may have begun to develop plant species into the domesticated forms they are today. Deliberate, extended-period storage was made possible by the use of "suspended floors for air circulation and protection from rodents". This practice "precedes the emergence of domestication and large-scale sedentary communities by at least 1,000 years".

Granaries are positioned in places between other buildings early on, c. 11,500 BP, however, beginning around 10,500 BP, they were moved inside houses, and by 9,500 BP, storage occurred in special rooms. This change might reflect changing systems of ownership and property as granaries shifted from communal use and ownership to become under the control of households or individuals.

It has been observed of these granaries that their "sophisticated storage systems with subfloor ventilation are a precocious development that precedes the emergence of almost all the other elements of the Near Eastern Neolithic package—domestication, large-scale sedentary communities, and the entrenchment of some degree of social differentiation". Moreover, "building granaries may [...] have been the most important feature in increasing sedentism that required active community participation in new life-ways".

== Extent ==
Work at the site of 'Ain Ghazal in Jordan has indicated a later Pre-Pottery Neolithic C period, which existed between 8,200 and 7,900 BP. Juris Zarins has proposed that a Circum Arabian Nomadic Pastoral Complex developed in the period from the climatic crisis of 6200 BC, partly as a result of an increasing emphasis in PPNB cultures upon animal domesticates, and a fusion with Harifian hunter gatherers in Southern Palestine, with affiliate connections with the cultures of Fayyum and the Eastern Desert of Egypt. Cultures practicing this lifestyle spread down the Red Sea shoreline and moved east from Syria into southern Iraq.

The culture disappeared during the 8.2 kiloyear event, a term that climatologists have adopted for a sudden decrease in global temperatures that occurred approximately 8,200 years before the present, or c. 6200 BC, and which lasted for the next two to four centuries. In the following Munhatta and Yarmukian post-pottery Neolithic cultures that succeeded it, rapid cultural development continues, although PPNB culture continued in the Amuq valley, where it influenced the later development of the Ghassulian culture.

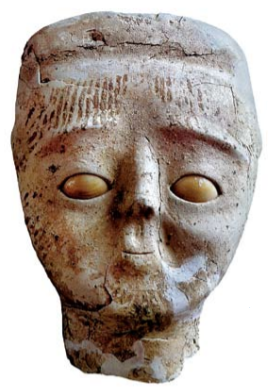
Head of statue, Jericho, from c. 9000 years ago. Displayed at the Rockefeller Archeological Museum in Jerusalem

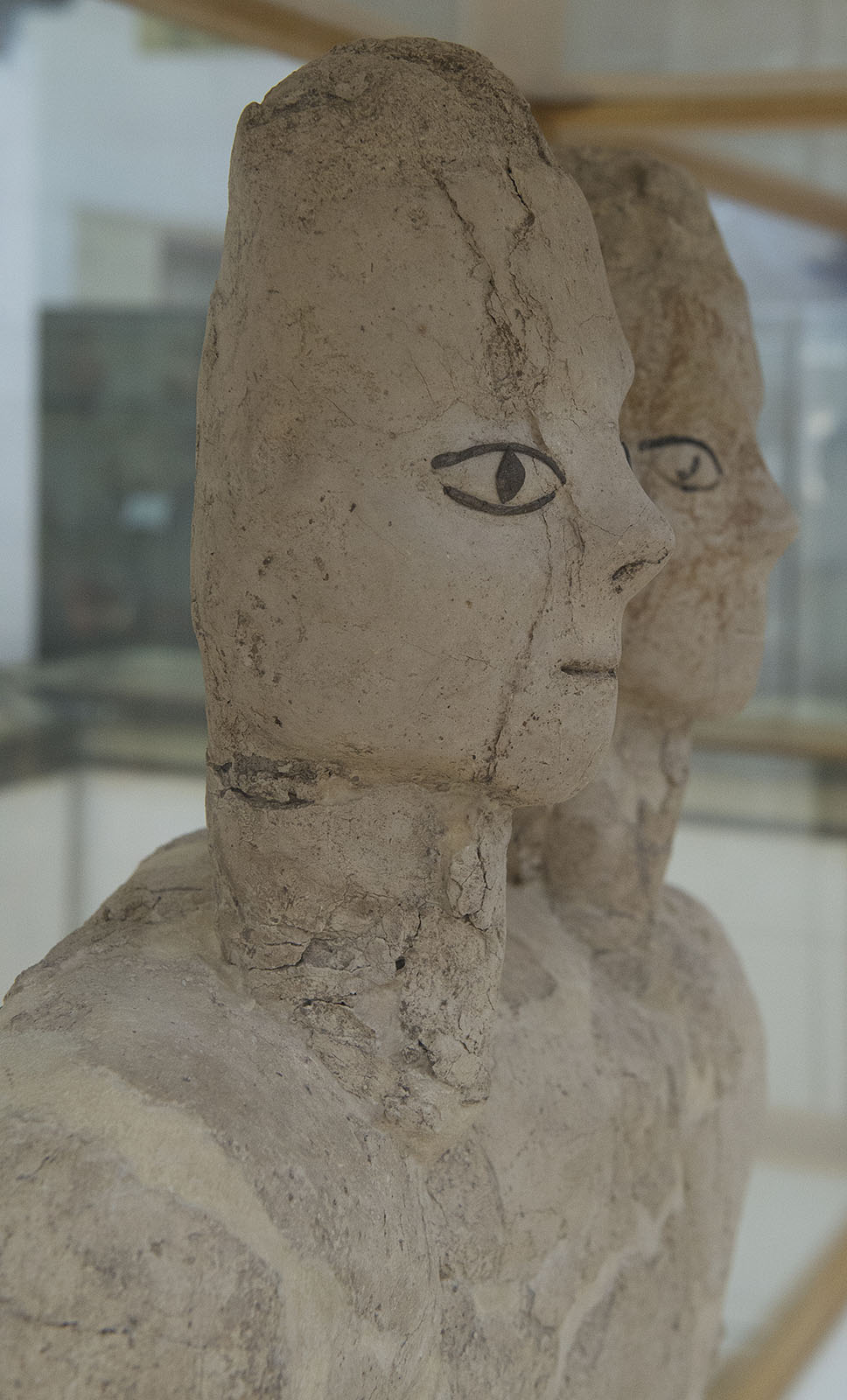
Left side-view of an Ain Ghazal statue from the Archaeological Museum of Amman

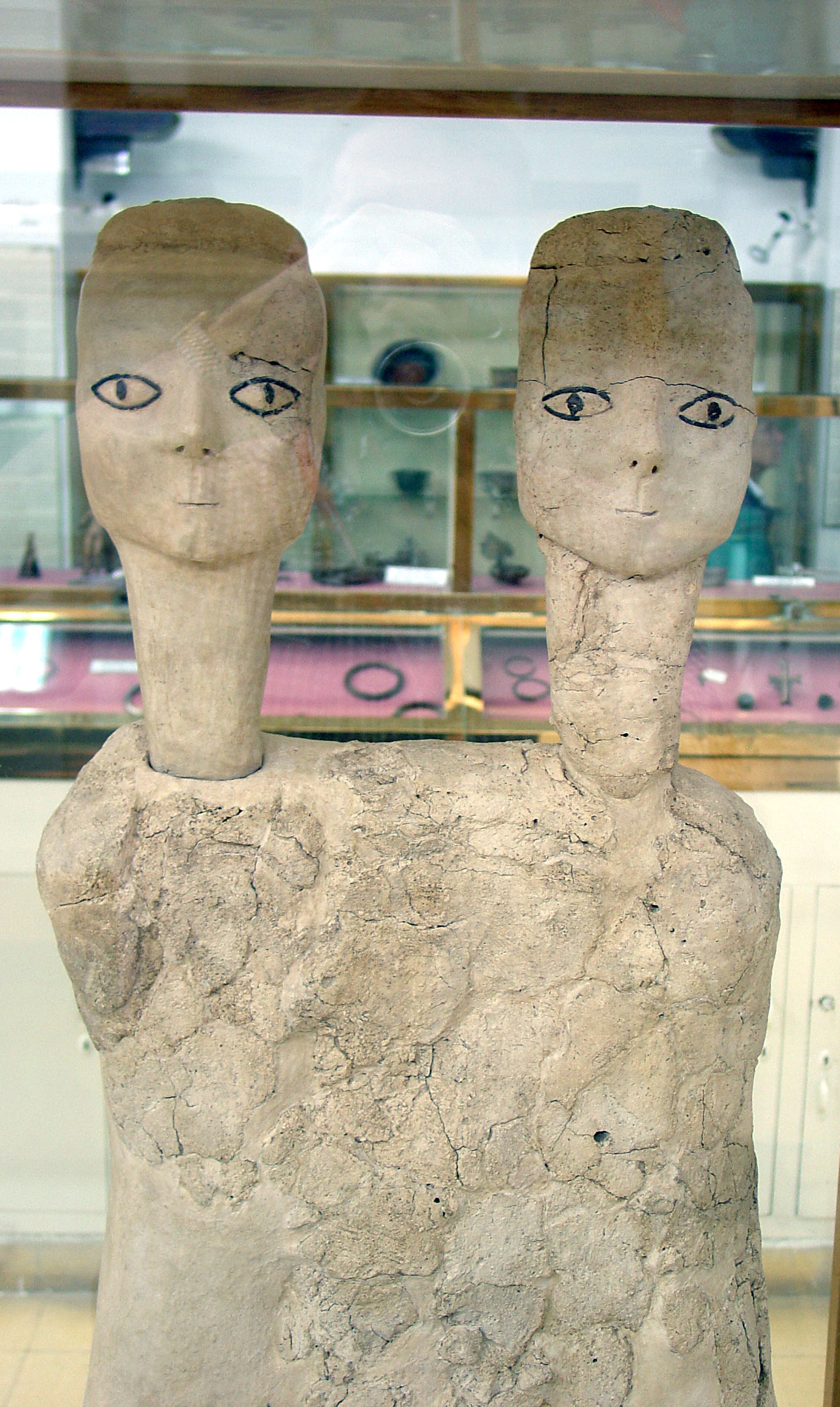
The ʿAin Ghazal bicephalous statues, c. 6500 BC.

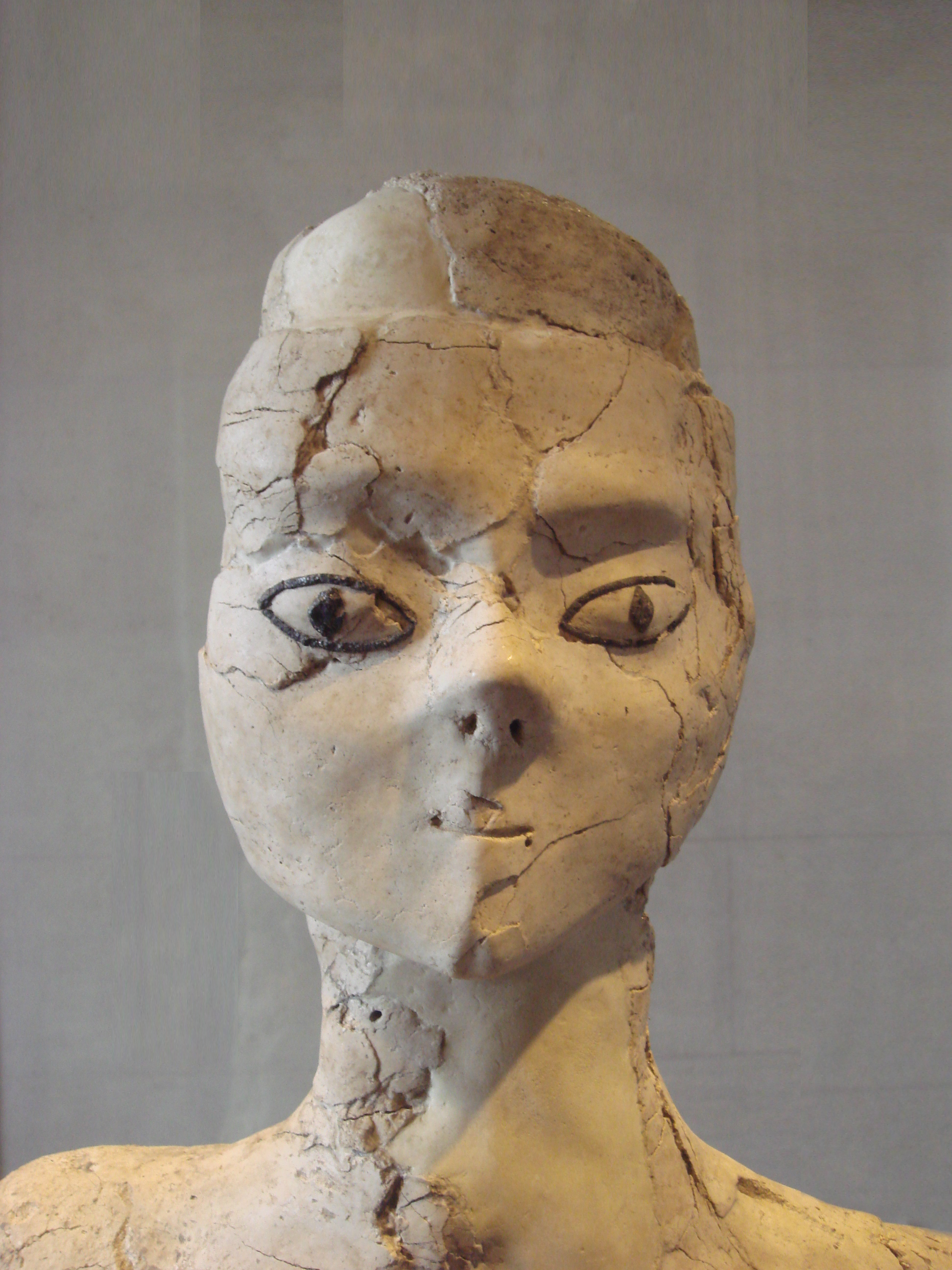
Musée du Louvre, Paris, Ain Ghazal statue frontal closeup

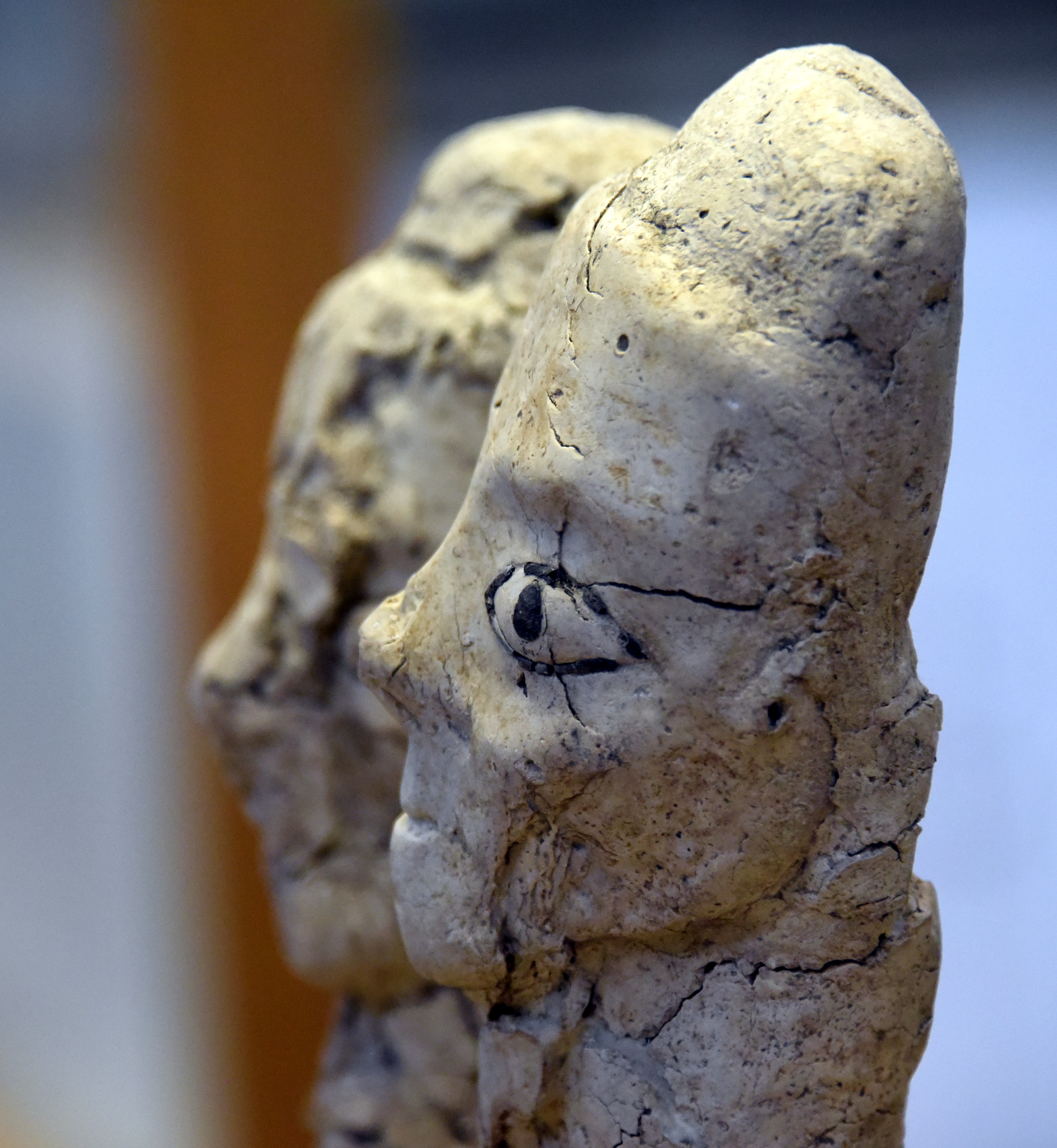
Right side-view of an Ain Ghazal statue

== Artifacts ==
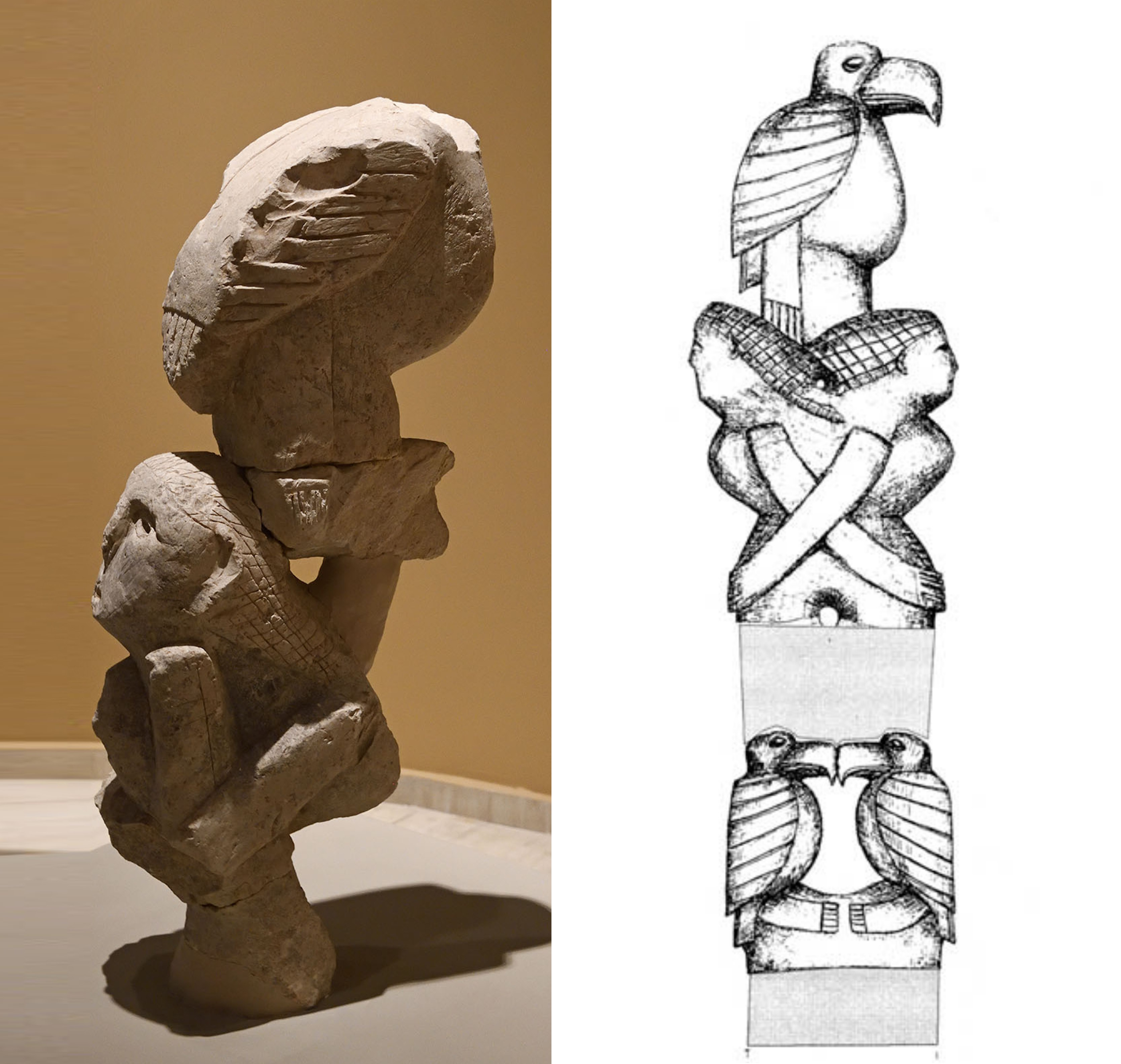
"Totem head", with tentative reconstruction. Nevalı Çori (8400–8100 BCE)

Around 8000 BC, before the invention of pottery, several early settlements became experts in crafting beautiful and highly sophisticated containers from stone, using materials such as alabaster or granite, and employing sand to shape and polish. Artisans used the veins in the material to maximum visual effect. Such objects have been found in abundance on the upper Euphrates river, in what is today eastern Syria, especially at the site of Bouqras. These form the early stages of the development of the art of Mesopotamia.

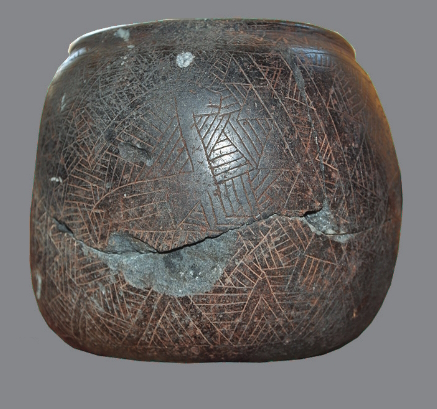
Stone vessel decorated with animal motif, Ayanlar Höyük (8800–7000 BC)

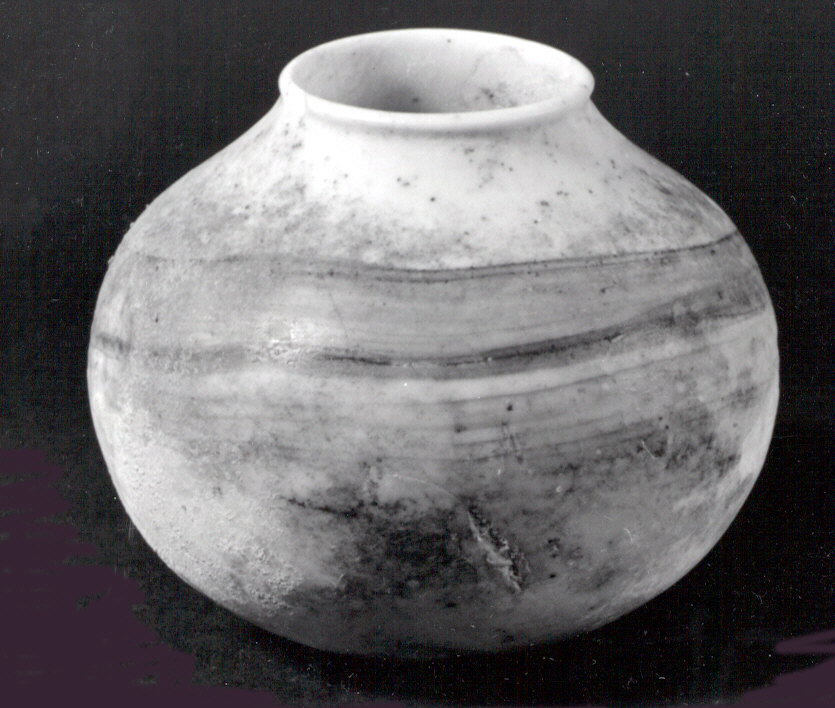
Jar in calcite alabaster, Syria, late 8th millennium BC

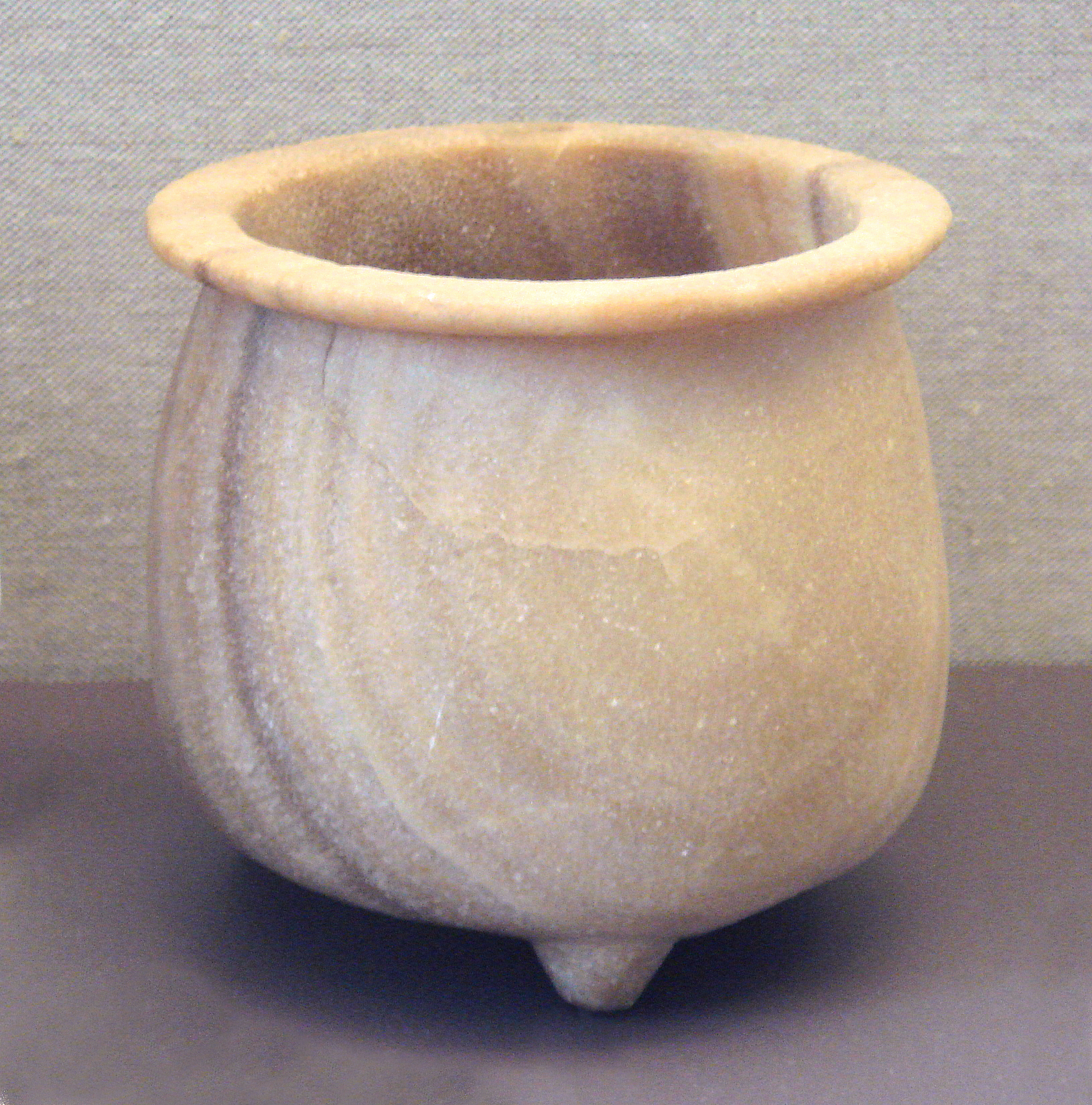
Calcite tripod vase, mid-Euphrates, probably from Tell Buqras, 6000 BC, Louvre Museum AO 31551

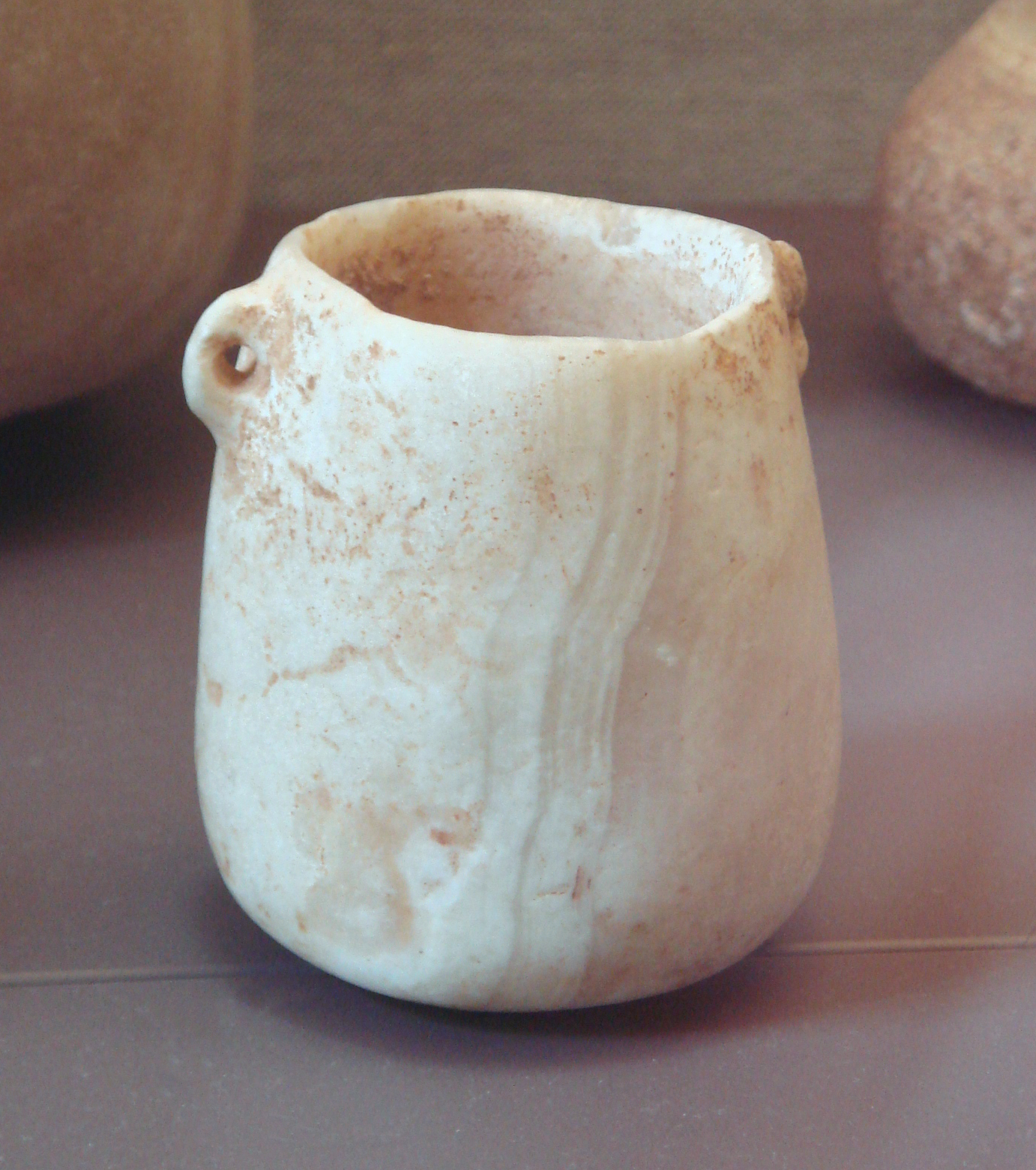
Alabaster pot with handles, Buqras region, 6500 BC Louvre Museum AO 28519

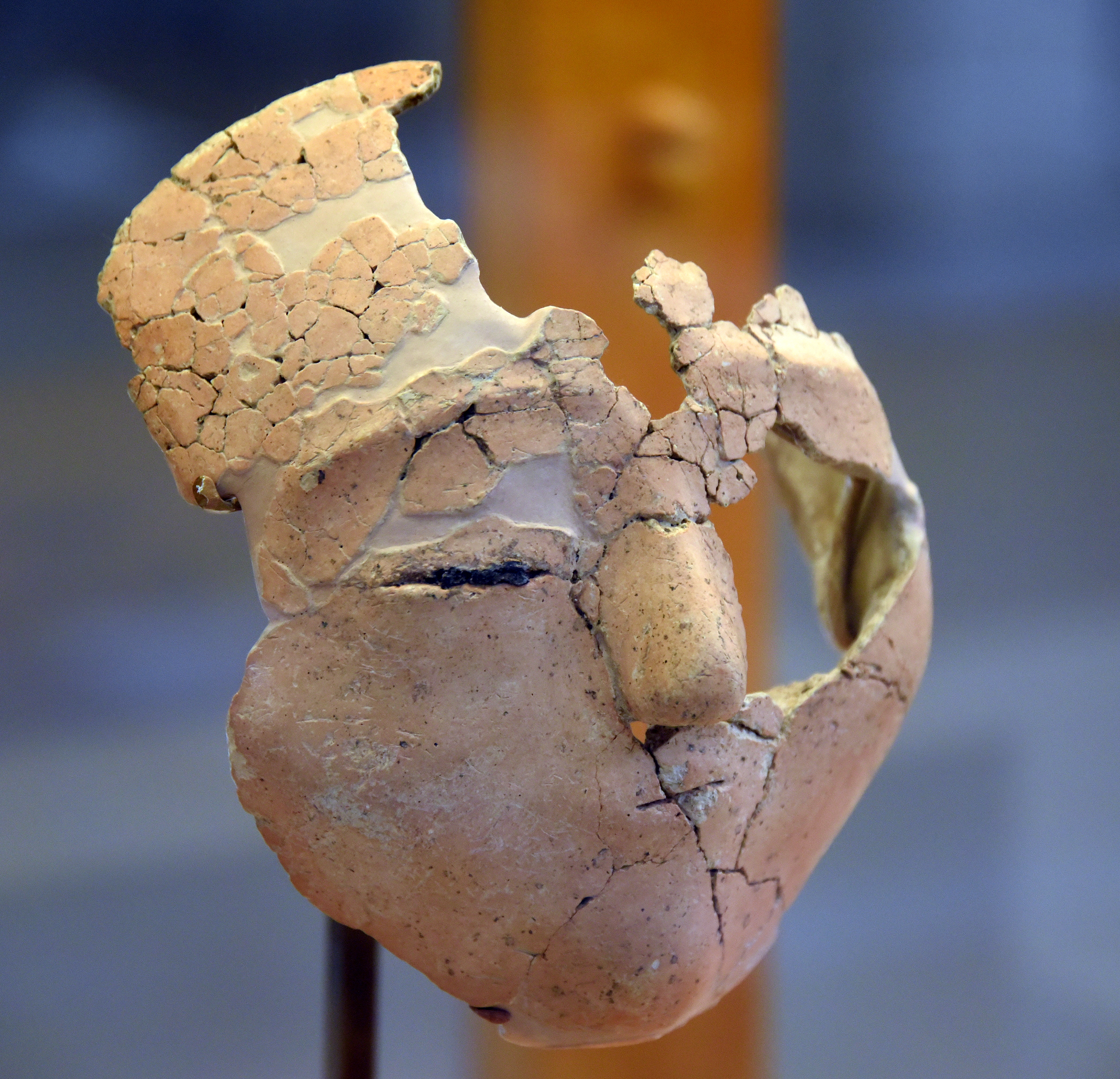
Plastered face mold from the Pre-Pottery Neolithic B, Amman, Jordan

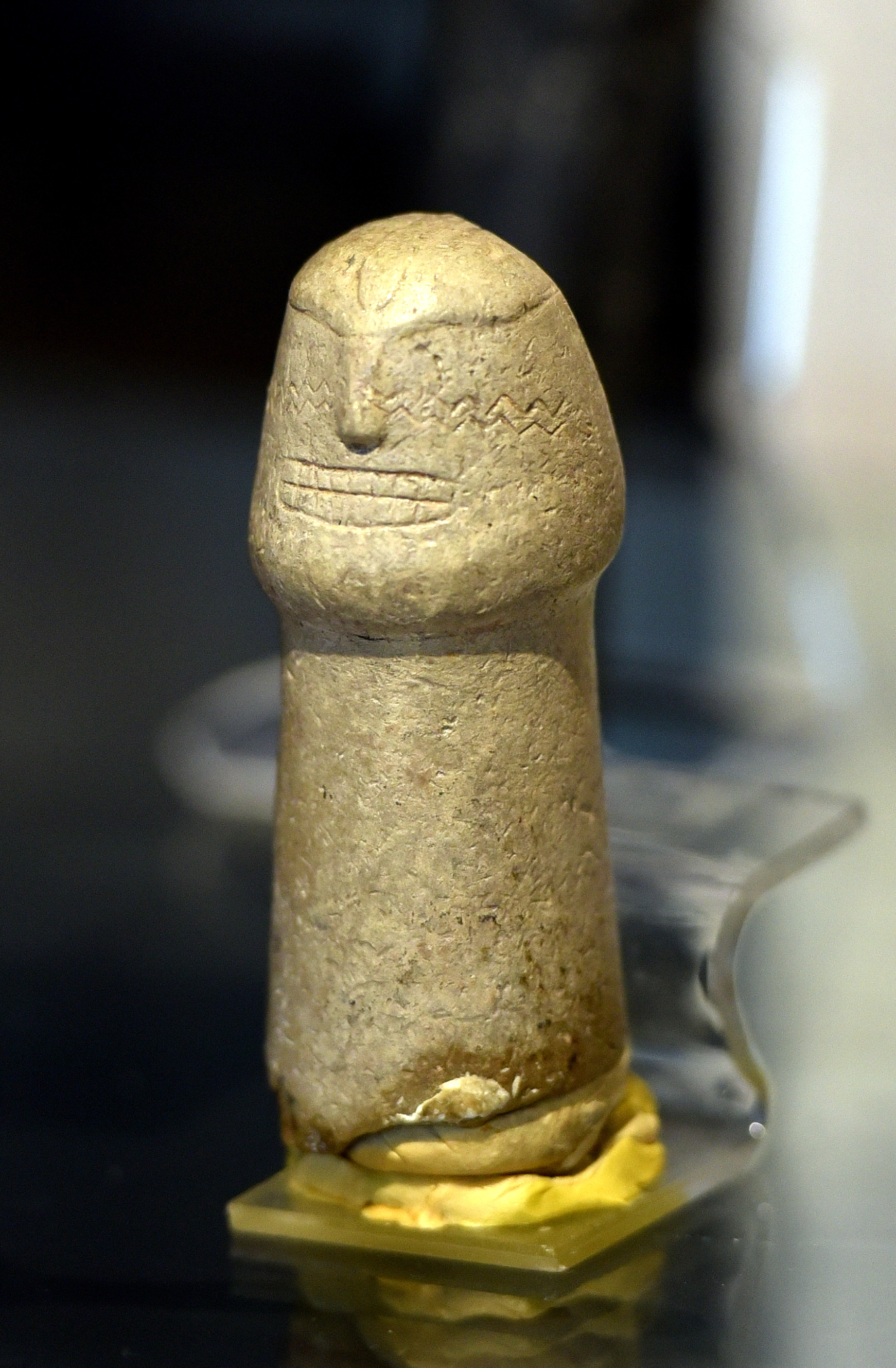
Phallic sculpture with engraved human figure. Nemrik, Iraq (7800–6500 BC). National Museum of Iraq, Baghdad

== Genetics ==
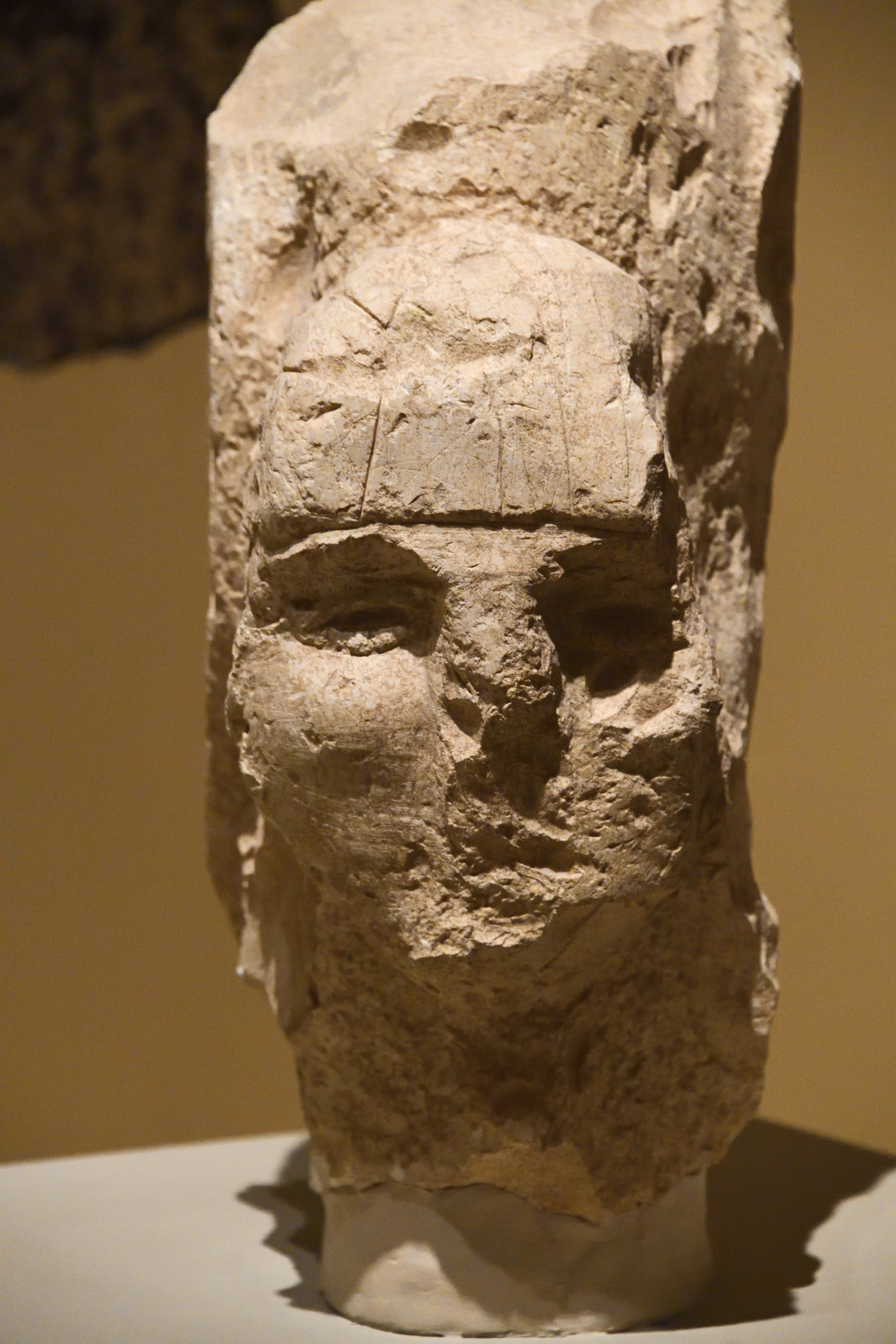
Sculpted head from Nevalı Çori, 8400–8100 BC (Urfa Museum)

Pre-Pottery Neolithic B fossils that were analysed for uniparentals via ancient DNA, were found to carry the Y-DNA (paternal) haplogroups E1b1b (2/7; ~29%), CT (2/7; ~29%), E(xE2,E1a,E1b1a1a1c2c3b1,E1b1b1b1a1,E1b1b1b2b) (1/7; ~14%), T(xT1a1,T1a2a) (1/7; ~14%), and H2 (1/7; ~14%). The CT clade was also observed in a Pre-Pottery Neolithic C specimen (1/1; 100%). Maternally, the rare basal haplogroup N* has been found among skeletal remains belonging to the Pre-Pottery Neolithic B, as have the mtDNA clades L3 and K.

DNA analysis has also confirmed ancestral ties between the Pre-Pottery Neolithic culture bearers and the makers of the Epipaleolithic Iberomaurusian culture of North Africa, the Mesolithic Natufian culture of the Levant, the Savanna Pastoral Neolithic culture of East Africa, the Early Neolithic Cardium culture of Morocco, and the Ancient Egyptian culture of the Nile Valley, with fossils associated with these early cultures all sharing a common genomic West Eurasian/Near-Eastern component. A paper from 2021 would find that the Mesolithic Natufians cluster the closest with modern Saudi Arabians, Desert Bedouins and Yemenis. The Natufians were also close to, and ancestral to the ancient Levant PPNB/C and the later Levantine Bronze Age samples.

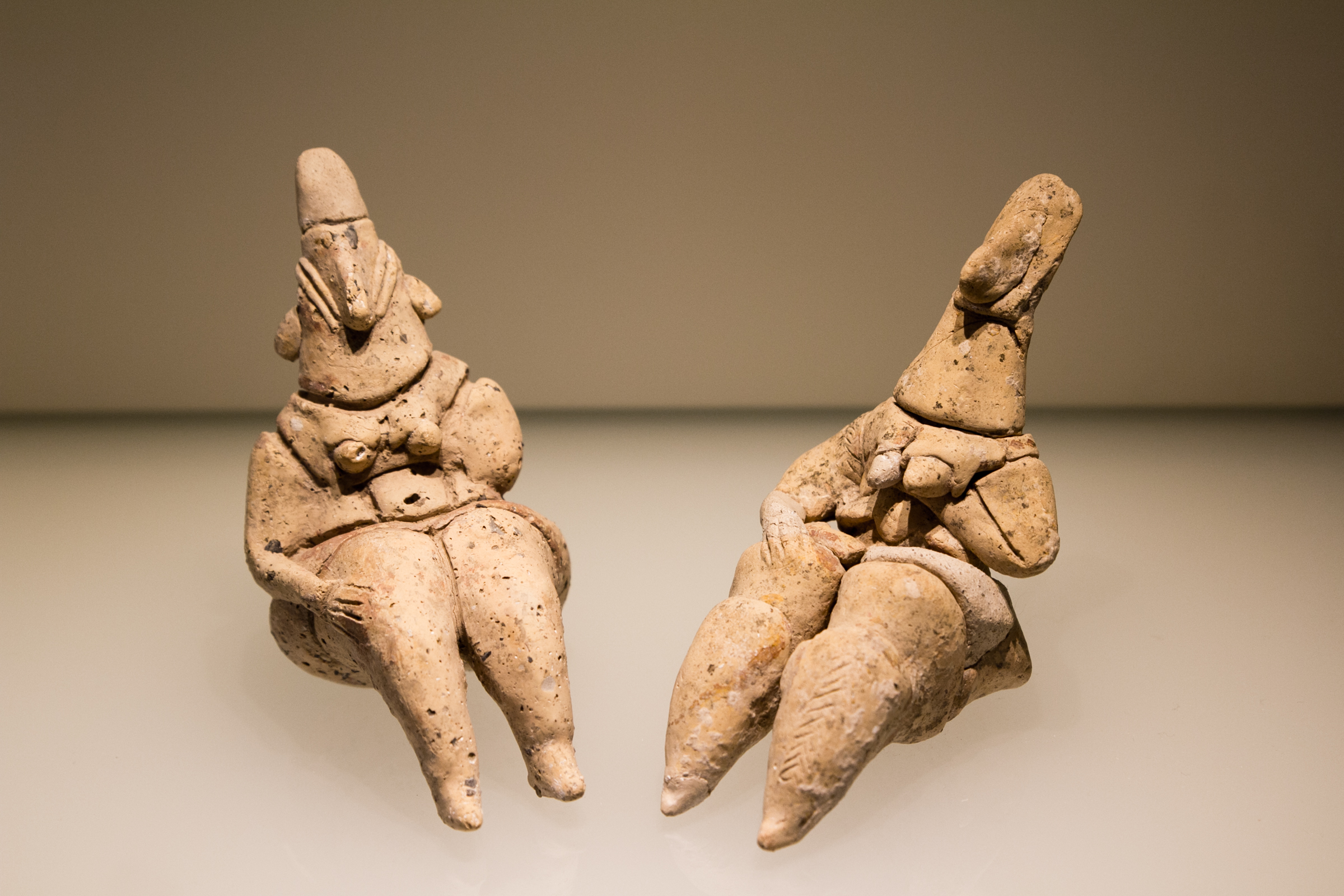
Yarmukian figurines, Yarmukian culture (5500–5000 BC), Pre-Pottery Neolithic B

Mathieson et al. (2015) and Lazardis et al. (2016) discovered that the Levant Neolithic samples from PPNB to PPNC were a mix of a component related to Natufians, and another lineage related to Anatolian farmers from Barcin and Mentese. In another study from 2021, the populations of the PPNB Levant were modelled as having 60.5% Israel Natufian Epipaleolithic related ancestry, and 39.5% Turkey Barcin Neolithic ancestry. Later, geneticists in 2022, using 1.2 million single nucleotide polymorphisms (SNPs), discovered that the ancient DNA of the Pre-Pottery Neolithic of Mesopotamia and Anatolia showed that these populations were formed through admixture of pre-Neolithic sources related to Anatolian, Caucasus, and Levantine hunter-gatherers.

Altınışık, N. Ezgi et al. (2022) studied 13 genomes from the PPNB at Cayonu, Turkey, and found they were formed by an admixture event between western and eastern populations of early Holocene Southwest Asia.

In 2023, Xiaoran Wang and team found that their six genetically analyzed PPNB individuals, were having ancestry from Levantine Epipaleolithic, Anatolian Neolithic, Iranian Neolithic, and Caucasus Hunter-Gatherers. The PPNB in general exhibited strong evidence of gene flow from populations related to Anatolia compared to the earlier Natufian hunter-gatherers. PPN individuals from Ain Ghazal further to the north in Jordan had a stronger genetic affinity with Anatolia than the PPN of Ba'ja did, although not significantly so.

According to a 2025 study, the Levant Neolithic populations from 10,000 years ago had 1.86% of Neanderthal ancestry (Fig. 4: Neanderthal ancestry and admixture graph). There is limited evidence of matrilocality.

== Diffusion ==
=== Carbon-14 dating ===
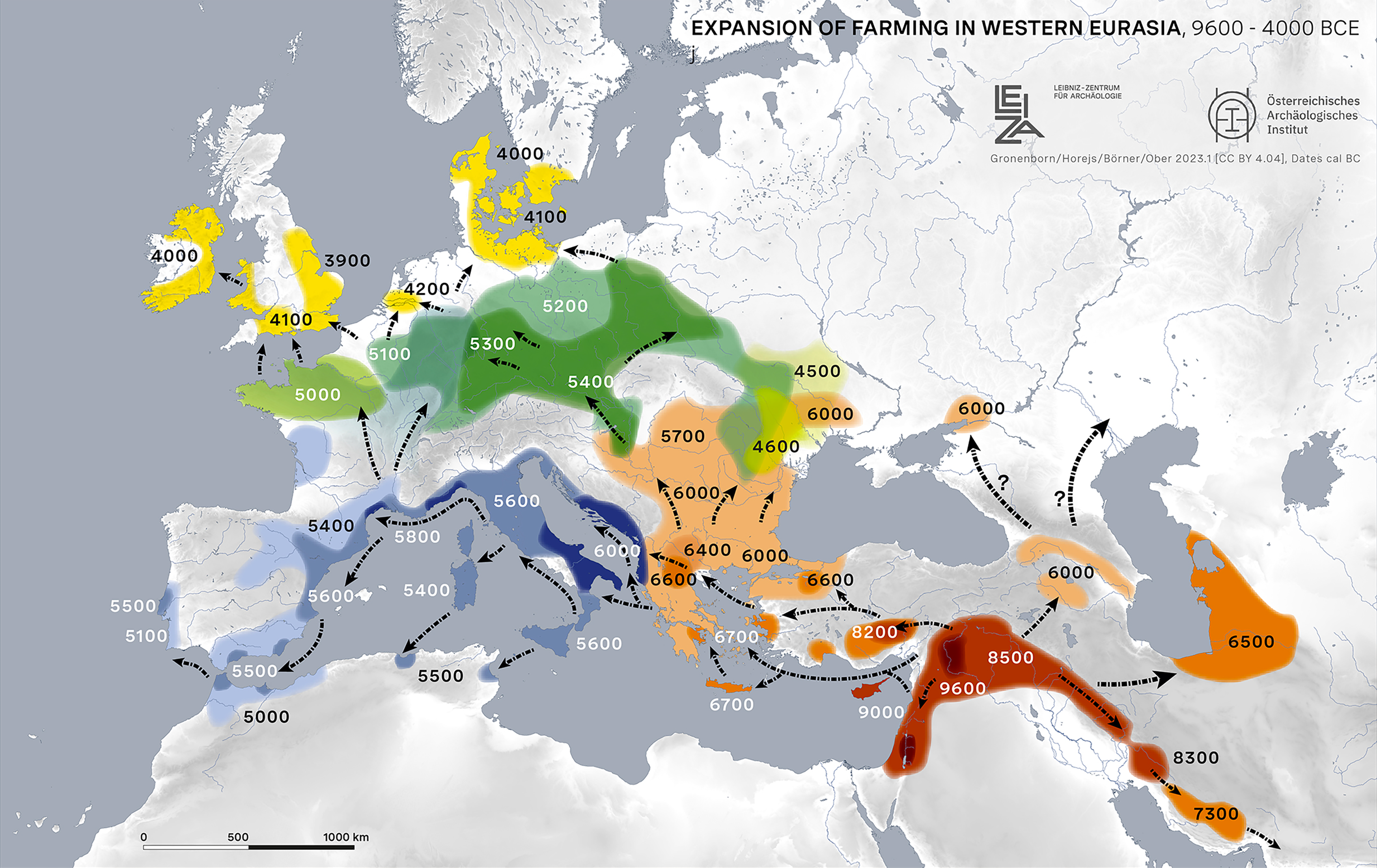
Neolithic expansions from the 10th to the 5th millennium BCE

The spread of the Neolithic in Europe was first studied quantitatively in the 1970s, when a sufficient number of 14C age determinations for early Neolithic sites had become available. Ammerman and Cavalli-Sforza discovered a linear relationship between the age of an Early Neolithic site and its distance from the conventional source in the Near East (Jericho), thus demonstrating that, on average, the Neolithic spread at a constant speed of about 1 km/yr. More recent studies confirm these results and yield the speed of 0.6–1.3 km/yr at 95% confidence level.

=== Analysis of mitochondrial DNA ===
Since the original human expansions out of Africa 200,000 years ago, different prehistoric and historic migration events have taken place in Europe. Considering that the movement of the people implies a consequent movement of their genes, it is possible to estimate the impact of these migrations through the genetic analysis of human populations. Agricultural and husbandry practices originated 10,000 years ago in a region of the Near East known as the Fertile Crescent. According to the archaeological record this phenomenon, known as "Neolithic", rapidly expanded from these territories into Europe. However, whether this diffusion was accompanied or not by human migrations is greatly debated. Mitochondrial DNA – a type of maternally inherited DNA located in the cell cytoplasm- was recovered from the remains of Pre-Pottery Neolithic B (PPNB) farmers in the Near East and then compared to available data from other Neolithic populations in Europe and also to modern populations from South Eastern Europe and the Near East. The obtained results show that substantial human migrations were involved in the Neolithic spread and suggest that the first Neolithic farmers entered Europe following a maritime route through Cyprus and the Aegean Islands. Recent genetical research confirms that "the main driver behind European Neolithization has been recognized as mass population movements from Anatolia and/or Southeast Europe".

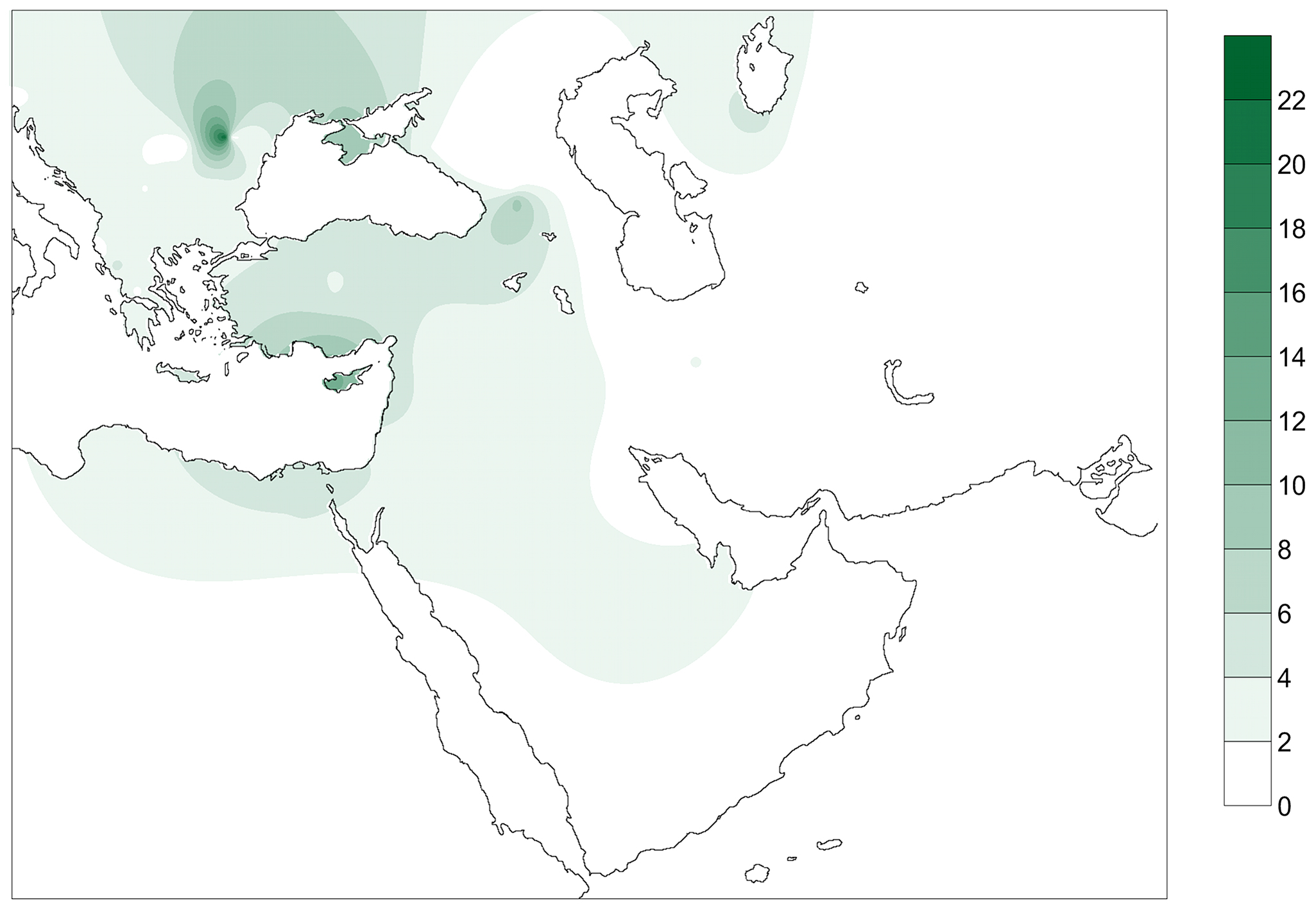
Modern distribution of the haplotypes of PPNB farmers

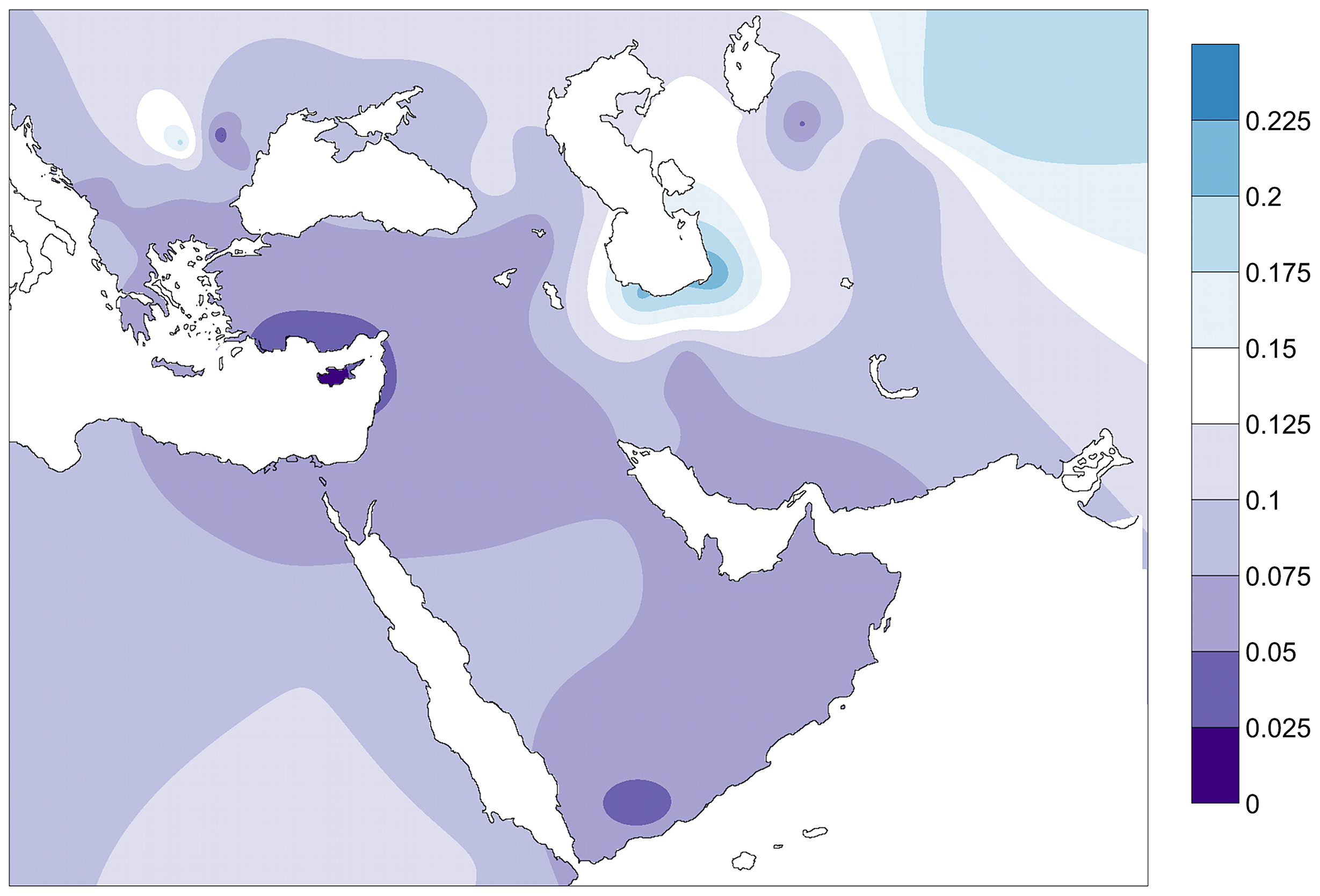
Genetic distance between PPNB farmers and modern populations

== See also ==
- Holocene climatic optimum
- Levantine archaeology#Ceramics analysis
- Prehistory of the Levant
- Upper Mesopotamia#Prehistory

== Sources ==
- Altınışık, N. Ezgi; Kazancı, Duygu Deniz; Aydoğan, Ayça; Gemici, Hasan Can; Erdal, Ömür Dilek; Sarıaltun, Savaş; Vural, Kıvılcım Başak; Koptekin, Dilek; Gürün, Kanat; Sağlıcan, Ekin; Fernandes, Daniel; Çakan, Gökhan; Koruyucu, Meliha Melis; Lagerholm, Vendela Kempe; Karamurat, Cansu; Özkan, Mustafa; Kılınç, Gülşah Merve; Sevkar, Arda; Sürer, Elif; Götherström, Anders; Atakuman, Çiğdem; Erdal, Yılmaz Selim; Özer, Füsun; Erim Özdoğan, Aslı; Somel, Mehmet (4 November 2022). "A genomic snapshot of demographic and cultural dynamism in Upper Mesopotamia during the Neolithic Transition". Science Advances. 8 (44) eabo3609. Bibcode:2022SciA....8O3609A. doi:10.1126/sciadv.abo3609. ISSN 2375-2548. PMC 9635823. PMID 36332018.
