= Willem van Zeist =

- Born: 12 March 1924; Apeldoorn, Gelderland
- Died: 7 October 2016 (aged 92); Bedum, Groningen
- Scientific career
- Fields: Archaeobotany
- Institutions: University of Groningen

Willem van Zeist (12 March 1924 – 7 October 2016) was a Dutch archaeobotanist and palynologist. He was the director of the Biologisch-Archaeologisch Instituut at the University of Groningen.

== Education ==
Van Zeist studied biology at the University of Utrecht, completing his PhD dissertation in 1955 on pollen analysis investigation in the Netherlands, with special reference to archaeology (Acta Botanica Neerlandica 4, 1955). From 1951 to 1989 he was linked to the Biologisch-Archaeologisch Instituut at the University of Groningen. He became lecturer there in 1967 and a professor in 1973.

== Research ==
=== Europe ===
Van Zeist conducted research in Europe on the oldest recovered canoe in the world, the Pesse canoe found in the Netherlands. According to C14 dating analysis it was found to be constructed somewhere between 8200 and 7600 BC. This canoe is exhibited in the Drents Museum in Assen, Netherlands.

Van Zeist studied the vegetational history and peat bogs of southeastern Drenthe and concluded that Neolithic settlements had begun there around 5000 BC. He also concluded that the prehistoric disc wheels found in the Netherlands dated to at least the Neolithic period. Van Zeist also conducted analytical studies of pollen cores and charred seeds and fruits from archaeological excavations at Gasselte, Noordbarge, Odoorn, Peelo and Wijster. In 1983 he became a member of the Royal Netherlands Academy of Arts and Sciences.

=== Near East ===
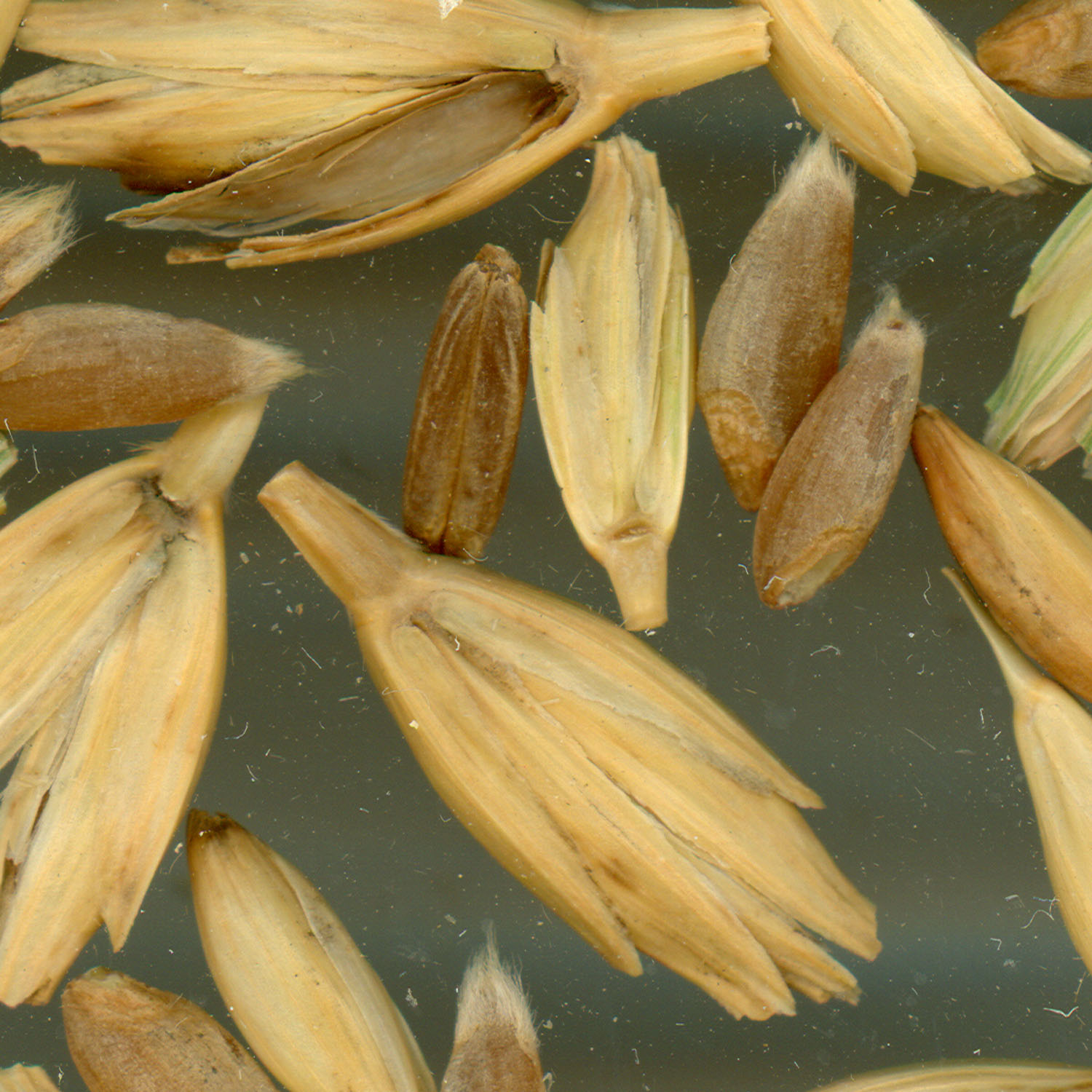
Van Zeist analysed the earliest known cultivated emmer wheat, from Tell Aswad

In 1975, van Zeist began work on establishing the climatological record for the Near East with pollen analyses from Iran and Turkey. Along with other studies he concluded that there had only been relatively minor fluctuations in the climate of this area since 5500 BC. He conducted paleobotanical studies and dating analyses at various Near Eastern archaeological sites such as Tell Ramad, Tell Ghoraife, El Kowm, Ras Shamra, Cayonu, Ganj Dareh, Mureybet and Tell Aswad. At the latter site near Mount Hermon in Syria, he made a find of the earliest cultivated Emmer Wheat yet found anywhere on Earth to date, along with what he considered to be domesticated peas and lentils along with other grains such as einkorn and barley at later stages.

== Selected bibliography ==
- van Zeist, Willem (1967). Archaeology and Palynology in the Netherlands. p. 21.
- Bintliff, John L.; van Zeist, Willem (1982). Palaeoclimates, palaeoenvironments and human communities in the Eastern Mediterranean region in later prehistory, Volume 2. International Union for Quaternary Research. Regional Subcommission for the Study of the Holocene of the Circum-Mediterranean Area, Rijksuniversiteit te Groningen. Biologisch-Archeologisch Instituut, B.A.R. ISBN 9780860541646.
- van Zeist, Willem; Bottema, Sytze (1991). Late Quaternary Vegetation of the Near East. L. Reichert. p. 156. ISBN 9783882265309.
- van Zeist, Willem; Casparie, W. A. (1984). Plants and Ancient Man: Studies in palaeoethnobotany. Proceedings of the Sixth Symposium of the International Work Group for Palaeoethnobotany, Groningen, 30 May-3 June 1983, Volume 1983. International Work Group for Palaeoethnobotany. Symposium, A.A. Balkema. p. 344. ISBN 9789061915287.
- van Zeist, Willem (2000). Cultivated and Wild Plants in Late- and Post-Medieval Groningen: A study of archaeological plant remains. s.n.
