= Victor Westhoff =

- Born: 12 November 1916; Situbondo Dutch East Indies
- Died: 12 March 2001 (aged 84); Zeist, the Netherlands
- Education: Utrecht University

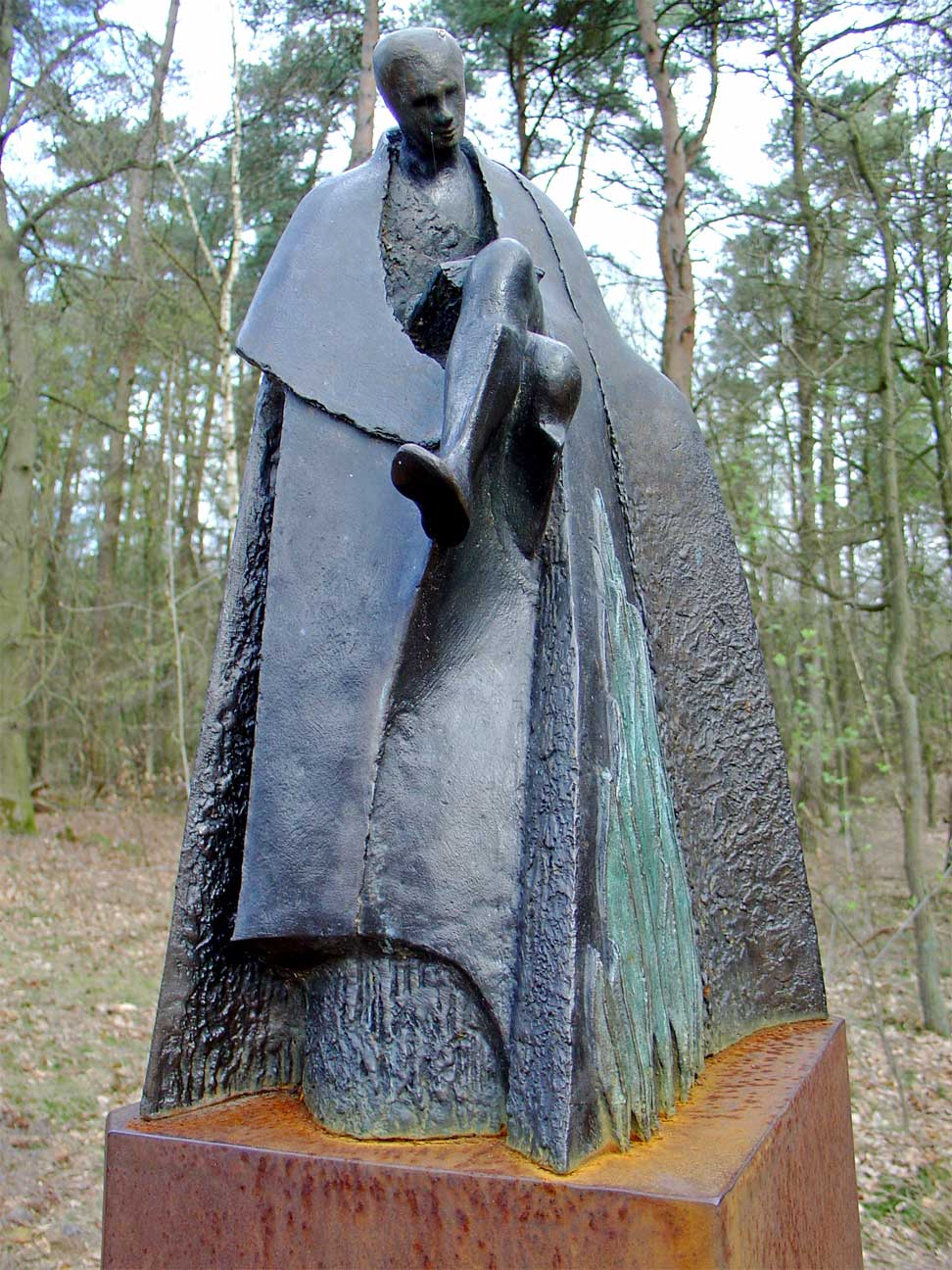
Statue of a botanist in honor of Victor Westhoff in the Springendal in Dinkelland

Victor Westhoff (12 November 1916 in Situbondo, Dutch East Indies – 12 March 2001 in Zeist) was a botanist at the Radboud University Nijmegen.

Westhoff published 700 scientific papers on phytosociology and conservation, as well as articles on classical music. In 1988 he was elected an honorary member of the International Association for Vegetation Science.

Between 1934 and 1942, Westhoff studied biology at Utrecht University and plant sociology with Josias Braun-Blanquet. In August 1945, he presented a paper, "Het biosociologisch onderzoek van natuurmonumenten" that became an influential work behind nature conservation in the Netherlands.

In 1974, he was elected member of the Royal Netherlands Academy of Arts and Sciences.
