= Henri de Contenson =

French archaeologist (1926–2019)

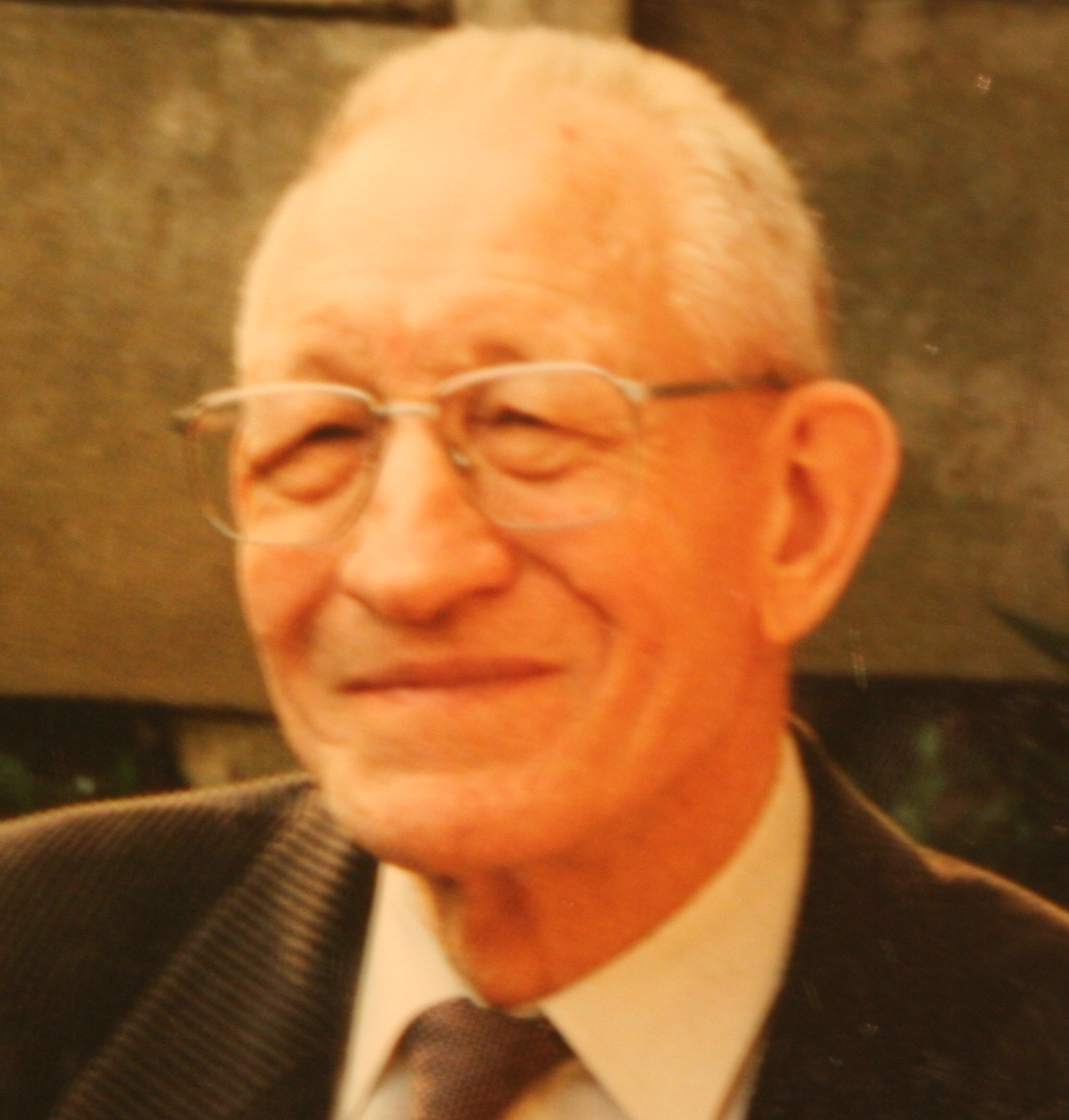
Henri de Contenson

Henri de Contenson (4 March 1926 – 8 September 2019) was a French archaeologist and a researcher at the CNRS, The Centre National de la Recherche Scientifique (National Center for Scientific Research), a research organization funded by France's Ministry of Research.

He was born in Paris in March 1926. A student of André Parrot, Raymond Lantier and André Leroi-Gourhan, he was Assistant Director of archaeological digs in the Middle East from 1951 to 1976. The results of his work are documented in numerous publications. He died in September 2019 at the age of 93.

== Books ==
- 1966 - La Basilique Chrétienne d'Aksha (The Christian Basilica of Aksha), Aksha I, Paris, 1966 (with appendices by J. de Heinzelin and P. Leman).
- 1992 - Préhistoire de Ras Shamra (Prehistory of Ras Shamra), I. Text, II. Figures and plates, Ras Shamra-Ougarit VIII, ERC, Paris, 1992 (in collaboration with Jacques Blot, Liliane Courtois, Monique Dupeyron & Arlette Leroi-Gourhan).
- 1995 - Aswad et Ghoraifé, sites néolithiques en Damascène (Syrie) aux IXe et VIIIe millénaires avant l'ère chrétienne, B.A.H. CXXXVII, Beyrouth, 1995 (in collaboration with Patricia Anderson, Marie-Claire Cauvin, Jacques Clère, Pierre Ducos, Monique Dupeyron, Claudine Maréchal & Danielle Stordeur).
- 2000 - Ramad, site néolithique en Damascène (Syrie) aux VIIIe et VIIe millénaires avant l'ère chrétienne, B.A.H. 157, Beyrouth, 2000 (in collaboration with Marie-Claire Cauvin, Liliane Courtois, Pierre Ducos, Monique Dupeyron, Willem van Zeist).
- 2001 - (in collaboration with Pierre de Longuemar) Mémorial 1939–1945, EHRET, Paris, 2001.
- 2004 - 50 ans de tessons. Propos sur l'Archéologie palestinienne, Paris, 2004.
- 2005 - Antiquités éthiopiennes. D'Axoum à Haoulti, Bibliothèque Peiresc 16, Saint-Mandé,
- 2007 - (in collaboration with Pierre de Longuemar) Mémorial 1939–1962, Paris, 2007.
