= Tell Ramad =

Neolithic tell in Syria

- تل رماد (Arabic)
- Location within Syria
- 33.360178°N 35.948949°E
- Type: Tell
- Periods: PPNA, PPNB, Neolithic
- Location: 20 km (12 mi) southwest of Damascus, Syria
- Region: Damascus basin
- Part of: village

History
- Built: c. 10,000–8000 BC

Site notes
- Material: clay, limestone
- Area: 2 hectares (220,000 ft^{2})
- Excavation dates: 1963–1973
- Archaeologists: Henri de Contenson
- Condition: ruins
- Management: Directorate-General of Antiquities and Museums
- Public access: Yes

Tell Ramad (Arabic: تل رماد) is a prehistoric, Neolithic tell at the foot of Mount Hermon, about 20 kilometres (12 mi) southwest of Damascus in Syria. It was inhabited as early as 10,000-8000 BC.

== History ==
The tell was the site of a small village of 2 hectares (220,000 ft^{2}), which was first settled in the late 8th millennium BC.

Notable features from the earliest stage include a number of 3–4 metre diameter, lime-plaster floored, clay lined oval pits with ovens & clay bins that were suggested to have been used as houses.

Tell Ramad is notable as one of the few sites fundamental to the understanding of the origin of agriculture with finds including various types of domesticated wheat, barley and flax. Emmer wheat is an important characteristic of Basin sites in this area, where it is thought to have been introduced. Wild plant foods include pistachios, almonds, figs and wild pears.

== Excavations ==
The tell was discovered by French customs officers, M Company and Lieutenant Potut. Laurisson Ward visited again in 1939 and collected material from the surface, now in the Peabody Museum. Tell Ramad lay somewhat forgotten until it was rediscovered by W.J. van Liere and Henri de Contenson, the latter leading excavations in 8 seasons between 1963 and 1973.

== See also ==
- History of Damascus
  - Tell Aswad
  - Old city of Damascus
  - Kingdom of Aram-Damascus
