= Tell Aswad =

Archaeological site in Syria

- تل أسود (Arabic)
- Location within Near East Location within Syria
- 33.40°N 36.55°E
- Type: Tell
- Periods: PPNB, Neolithic
- Location: 30 km (19 mi) from Damascus, Syria
- Region: Damascus basin
- Part of: Village

History
- Built: c. 8700 BC
- Abandoned: c. 7500 BC

Site notes
- Material: Clay, Limestone
- Length: 250 metres (820 ft)
- Width: 250 metres (820 ft)
- Area: 5 hectares (540,000 ft^{2})
- Excavation dates: 1971-1976; 2001-2006
- Archaeologists: Henri de Contenson; Danielle Stordeur; Bassam Jamous
- Condition: Ruins
- Management: Directorate-General of Antiquities and Museums
- Public access: Yes

Tell Aswad (Arabic: تل أسود, "Black Hill"), Su-uk-su or Shuksa, is a large prehistoric, Neolithic tell, about 5 hectares (540,000 ft^{2}) in size, located around 48 kilometres (30 mi) from Damascus in Syria, on a tributary of the Barada River at the eastern end of the village of Jdeidet el Khass.

== Excavation ==
Tell Aswad was discovered in 1967 by Henri de Contenson who led excavations in 1971–1972. The Aswadian culture found by de Contenson was far too advanced for its calibrated dating than anything else found in the region, and the only example ever found of this culture. Further technical investigation of the lithic series by Frédéric Abbès revealed inconsistencies so it was recently decided to re-excavate in six seasons by the French Permanent Archaeological Mission El Kowm-Mureybet under the co-direction of Danielle Stordeur and Bassam Jamous between 2001 and 2006. Investigations into the materials found are ongoing at the National Museum of Damascus.

The most recent fieldwork at Tell Aswad has led to a reevaluation of its dating, with the Aswadian or Pre-Pottery Neolithic A (PPNA) period (9500–8700 cal BC) now considered to be absent. Instead, radiocarbon dating of the new excavations, and of seeds from the 1970s excavations, documents occupation in the Pre-Pottery Neolithic B (PPNB) period, split into three parts; PPNB Ancien (Early PPNB) from 8700 to 8200 cal BC and the PPNB Moyen (Middle PPNB) from 8200 to 7500 BC. The PPNB Récent (Late PPNB) has been equated with Dunand's "Néolithique ancien de Byblos".

== Construction ==
The first PPNB period involved construction of massive earth architecture, layering soil with reeds to construct walls. The inhabitants of Tell Aswad invented the brick on site by modelling earth clods with beds of reeds, which they then formed into raw bricks and eventually dried in later stages. Houses were round from beginning to the end of the settlement, elliptical or polygonal and were partly buried or laid. The orientation of the openings is most often to the east. This conforms with sites in the Southern Levant, whereas Northern Euphrates Valley sites generally display rectangular houses.

== Culture ==
Tools and weapons were made of flint including Aswadian and Jericho point arrowheads. Other finds included grinding equipment, stone and mud containers, and ornaments made of various materials. Obsidian was imported from Anatolia. Basketry and weaving were commonplace with the imprint of embroidered fabric recorded on a fragment of plaster. Modeling clay and stone figurines of people, animals and geometric shapes such as spheres, cones, discs took place since the beginning of the settlement; these were sometimes mixed with vegetables. The graves of more than one hundred well-preserved individuals were found. In the first half of occupation these were found in or around the homes, in later stages cemeteries are isolated outside the village. A collection of nine technically and stylistically similar, overmodelled skulls were retrieved from two areas. Detailed study of the skulls is currently underway to provide insight into the traditions and social ties of the villagers. The residents of Tell Aswad reserved a very sophisticated treatment for the dead: skulls were removed and cleaned, with a face modelled directly onto the bone with lime plaster and then painted.

Tell Aswad has been cited as being of importance for the evolution of organised cities due to the appearance of building materials, organized plans and collective work. It has provided insight into the "explosion of knowledge" in the northern Levant during the PPNB Neolithic stage following dam construction.

== Plant and animal domestication ==
Area of the Fertile Crescent, circa 7500 BC, with main sites. Tell Aswad is one of the important sites of the Pre-Pottery Neolithic period. The area of Mesopotamia proper was not yet settled by humans.

Understanding of the role of Tell Aswad in the beginnings of farming has been complicated by changes in dating. Originally it was thought to be an example of one of the oldest sites of agriculture with domesticated emmer wheat dated by Willem van Zeist and his assistant Johanna Bakker-Heeres to the PPNA at 7600-7300 uncal BC (about 9000 cal BC). The claim is based on the discovery of enlarged grains, absences of wild grains and on the presumption that the site was beyond the usual habitat of the wild variety of emmer wheat. Flax seeds were present, and fruit, figs, and pistachios were found in large quantities. Stationary containers of mud and stone were found with carbonized grain on the interior of one, designating them as silos. Finally, reeds were widely used, especially as reinforcement in the architecture, but also for mats and baskets and perhaps as bedding or fodder. Despite the (apparently) early date of domesticated plants, Jacques Cauvin considered that Aswad was not the center for the origin of agriculture, stating that its first inhabitants "arrived, perhaps from the neighboring Anti-Lebanon, already equipped with the seeds for planting, for their practice of agriculture from the inception of the settlement is not in doubt. Thus it was not in the oasis itself that they carried out their first experiments in farming."

Studies of lithics and radiocarbon dating of the 2001–2006 excavations showed that Tell Aswad was not occupied during the PPNA period. Instead the domesticated plants are present from the Early PPNB 8700 to 8200 cal BC onwards. Analysis of c. 400 samples collected from the most recent excavations generally confirms van Zeist & Bakker-Heeres's identifications from the earlier excavations. Domesticated barley is present; the domestication status of emmer wheat is uncertain. It has been speculated that irrigation or some form of water management would have been used in order to allow cultivation of cereals and figs in an area with under 200mm rainfall. The redating of the earliest levels of Tell Aswad to the early PPNB place it alongside other sites with domesticated cereals such as Cafer Hüyük and Aşıklı Höyük (Turkey), Ganj Dareh and Chogah Golan (Iran), and Wadi el-Jilat 7 and Ain Ghazal (Jordan). Tell Aswad can now be seen as part of a pattern of multi-regional, dispersed local development in at least five areas of the Near East, rather than as uniquely early evidence pointing to agricultural origins in the southern Levant. The preceding PPNA period is now widely accepted as encompassing pre-domestic cultivation of wild cereals, rather than full agriculture with domesticated crops.

A large number of goats were evident in the early stages indicating they were either hunted or herded. This is an important issue because the period when animal domestication first took place is still an open question. From the middle PPNB, the presence of corralled animals is evident. There are pigs, sheep, goats and cattle. For the latter two, production of meat and milk has been noted. In addition, cattle often show diseases resulting from their use for labour. The image that results from the study of the archaeozoological evidence is a village of farmers and herders in full possession of food production techniques. Hunting is well represented with two species of horses, two gazelles (mountain gazelle and Persian gazelle), wild boars, many water birds and some birds of the steppes. Finally, fishing is practiced throughout the occupation of the site. The presence of flora such as water reeds, rushes and tamarisk shows that the site was close to a very humid environment. The presence of bones of fish and aquatic birds like ducks, cranes and geese, indicated that the site was located near a lake and the inhabitants of Neolithic Aswad fully exploited its resources.

== Literature ==
- Cauvin, Jacques, The Birth of the Gods and the origins of agriculture, Cambridge, 2000.
- Kuijt, Ian and Goring-Morris, Nigel., Foraging, Farming, and Social Complexity in the Pre-Pottery Neolithic of the Southern Levant: A Review and Synthesis, Journal of World Prehistory, Volume 16, Number 4.
