= Frédéric Abbès =

French archaeologist

- Occupations: Archaeologist, Research Engineer
- Employer: CNRS
- Known for: Work on Tell Aswad and El Kowm
- Title: Council member of the Archéorient laboratory

Frédéric Abbès is a French archaeologist working on postdoctoral research, specialising in the stone or lithic industry of the Near East and Mediterranean. He has worked on important archaeological sites such as Tell Aswad and El Kowm.

== Positions held ==
- Research Engineer at CNRS.
- 2010 - Due to take over Directorship of the French Ministry of Foreign Affairs permanent mission to El Kowm-Mureybet (Syria).
- Council member of the Archéorient laboratory of the Maison de l'Orient Méditerranéen, Lyon.
- Operations Director of the Bal'a project called "Arid environment occupation during the Neolithic" (Syria).

== Current Projects ==
- Studies of the Neolithic site of Qdeir near El Kowm, Syria.
- Studies of the lithic industries at Jerf el Ahmar.
- Studies of the lithic industries at Tell Aswad.
- Studies of the Neolithic site of Kovačevo, Bulgaria.

== Fieldwork ==
- Excavations at Qdeir (Syria)
- Initial survey and excavations at Bal'a and the mountain regions of Palmyra.
- Executive Assistant to Danielle Stordeur at Tell Aswad. Fieldwork has currently stopped at Tell Aswad due to cuts in funding and the current political situation. Frédéric is currently involved in the critically important work of publishing the latest discoveries from this site, where domesticated Emmer wheat was first discovered at c.a. 8800 BCE, likely from a yet undiscovered inter-montane site in the Anti-Lebanon that caused the PPNB "explosion" of human culture in this area.

== Selected bibliography ==
- Abbes, Frederic., "Méthodes d’approche de la variabilité du débitage laminaire. Application à des armatures perçantes de Cheikh Hassan (Syrie, VIIIème millénaire B.C.)", Cahiers de l’Euphrate 7, p. 119-150, 1993.
- Abbes, Frederic., "Techniques de débitage et gestion du silex sur le Moyen Euphrate (Syrie) au PPNA final et au PPNB ancien", in H. G. Gebel et S.K. Kozlowski (éds), Neolithic Chipped Stone Industries of the Fertile Crescent, Proceedings of the First Workshop on PPN Lithic Industries, Berlin 1993, Studies in Early Near-Eastern Production, Subsistence and Environment 1, Berlin, ex. oriente, p. 299-312, 1994.
- Abbes, Frederic., "Réflexions concernant les nucléus bipolaires et naviformes du Proche-Orient Néolithique", Cahiers de l’Euphrate 8, p. 139-150, 1998.
- Abbes, Frederic., N. BALKAN-ALTI, D. Binder, M.-C. Cauvin,. " Étude technologique préliminaire de l’industrie lithique d’Asikli Höyük", Tüba-Ar II, p. 117-137, 1999.
- Abbes, Frederic., M.-C. Cauvin, B. GRATUZE, BELLOT-GURLET L., C. Bressy and POUPEAU G., "Nouvelles recherches sur l’obsidienne de Cheikh Hassan (Vallée de l’Euphrate, Syrie) au Néolithique : PPNA et PPNB ancien", Syria 78, p. 5-17, 2001
- Abbes, Frederic., DERAPRAHAMIAN G., "Pression et Percussion : Identification des stigmates sur des nucléus naviformes (Syrie)", in L. Bourguignon et I. Ortega (éds), Préhistoire et approche expérimentale, Editions M. Mergoal, (Série Préhistoire 5), Montagnac, p. 195-205, 2002.
- Abbes, Frederic., Étude des industries lithiques du néolithique précéramique de Syrie du Xème au VIIIème millénaire B.P., BAR-Tempus reparatum, Maison de l’Orient, 2002.
- Stordeur D., Abbes, Frederic., "Du PPNA au PPNB : mise en lumière d’une phase de transition à Jerf el Ahmar (Syrie)", Bulletin de la Société Préhistorique Française, 99/3, p 563–595, 2002.
