= Qdeir =

Natural geographic feature in modern-day Syria

- Location within Syria
- 35.15°N 38.81667°E
- Type: tell
- Periods: PPNB, Neolithic
- Location: Homs Governorate, Syria

History
- Built: c. 7000 BC
- Abandoned: c. 6500 BC

Site notes
- Material: Flint, Bone, Plaster
- Archaeologists: Frédéric Abbès; Danielle Stordeur; Oliver Aurenche; Marie-Claire Cauvin
- Condition: Ruins
- Management: Directorate-General of Antiquities and Museums
- Public access: Yes

Qdeir is a prehistoric, Neolithic Tell and plateau in the El Kowm oasis, a 20 km (12 mi) gap in the Syrian mountains that houses a series of archaeological sites. It is located northeast of Palmyra in Syria, near Al-Sukhnah.

== Excavation ==
The site was tested in 1980 by Olivier Aurenche and Marie-Claire Cauvin, with further excavations between 1989 and 1993 by Danielle Stordeur that are ongoing under Frédéric Abbès. Rectangular buildings with plastered floors and White Ware were found along with various arrowheads, sickle blades and a "desert burin". The collection found at the site has been referred to as a special "desert facies" of PPNB flints.

== Culture ==
The inhabitants of Qdeir are thought to have been nomadic pastoralists who were only part-time farmers from a later Neolithic tradition in comparison to the agriculturalist inhabitants of the village sites of El Kowm. Evidence suggests the location was used as a campsite with only short term occupations deduced from scatters of surface finds. The relationship between the two contemporaneous groups of inhabitants of the area and their behaviors have been discussed by the excavators, who highlight similar construction techniques, use of plaster and basket making. Obsidian, rare stones, stoneware vessels and shells used by both groups also originate from the same places.

== Literature ==
- Aurenche, O. and MC Cauvin., Qdeir 1, campagne 1980: Une installation neolithique du Vile millenaire, 1982.
- Cauvin, Jacques., El Khabra un poste de chasse néolithique du PPNB final de faciès Qdeir (Oasis d'El Kowm, Syrie). Cahiers de l'Euphrate 5-6 47–53. Pans ERC., 1991.
