= Pre-Pottery Neolithic A =

Middle Eastern Neolithic culture

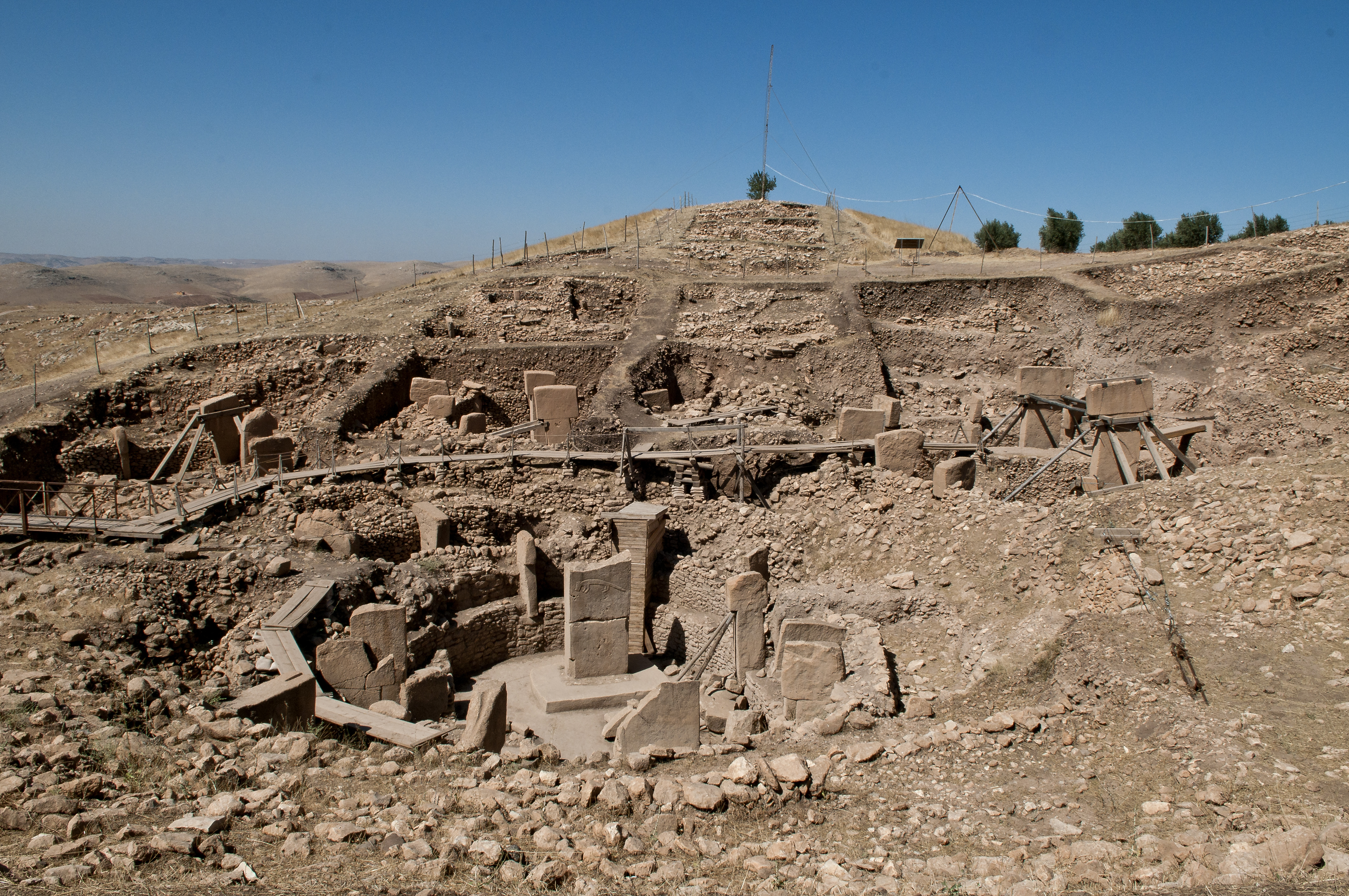
- The ruins of Göbekli Tepe, c. 9,000 BCE
- Geographical range: Near East
- Period: Pre-Pottery Neolithic
- Dates: c. 10,000 – c. 8,800 BCE
- Type site: Jericho
- Preceded by: Natufian
- Followed by: Pre-Pottery Neolithic B, Neolithic Greece, Faiyum A culture

Pre-Pottery Neolithic A (PPNA) denotes the first stage of the Pre-Pottery Neolithic, in early Levantine and Anatolian Neolithic culture, dating to c. 12,000 – c. 10,800 years ago, that is, 10,000–8800 BCE. Archaeological remains are located in the Levantine and Upper Mesopotamian region of the Fertile Crescent.

The time period is characterized by tiny circular mud-brick dwellings, the cultivation of crops, the hunting of wild game, and unique burial customs in which bodies were buried below the floors of dwellings.

The Pre-Pottery Neolithic A and the following Pre-Pottery Neolithic B (PPNB) were originally defined by Kathleen Kenyon in the type site of Jericho, State of Palestine. During this time, pottery was not yet in use. They precede the ceramic Neolithic Yarmukian culture. PPNA succeeds the Natufian culture of the Epipalaeolithic Near East.

== Settlements ==
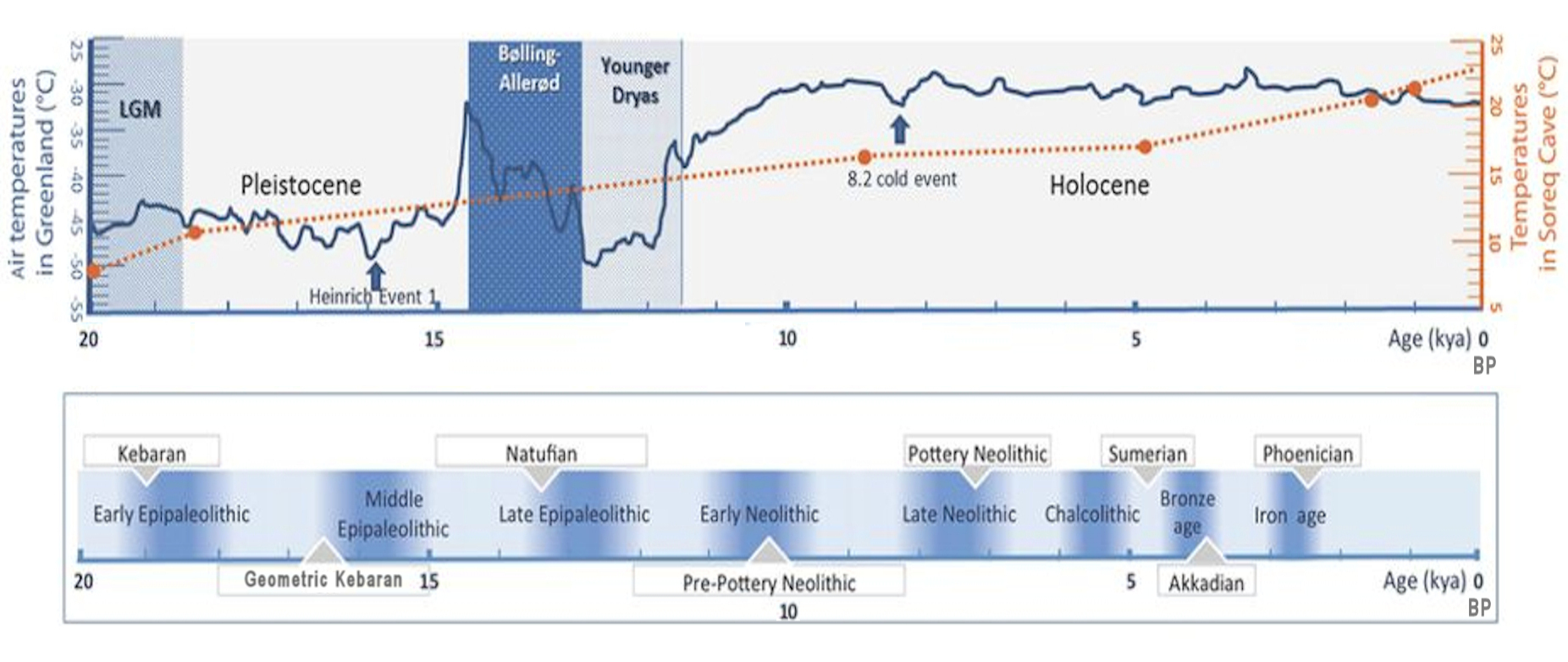
Evolution of temperatures in the Post-Glacial period according to Greenland ice cores. The Pre-Pottery Neolithic corresponds to the period of warming of the Holocene.

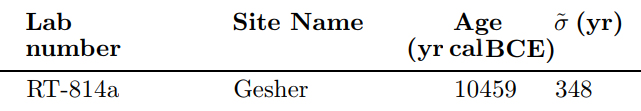
Calibrated Carbon 14 dates for Gesher, the earliest known Neolithic site as of 2013.

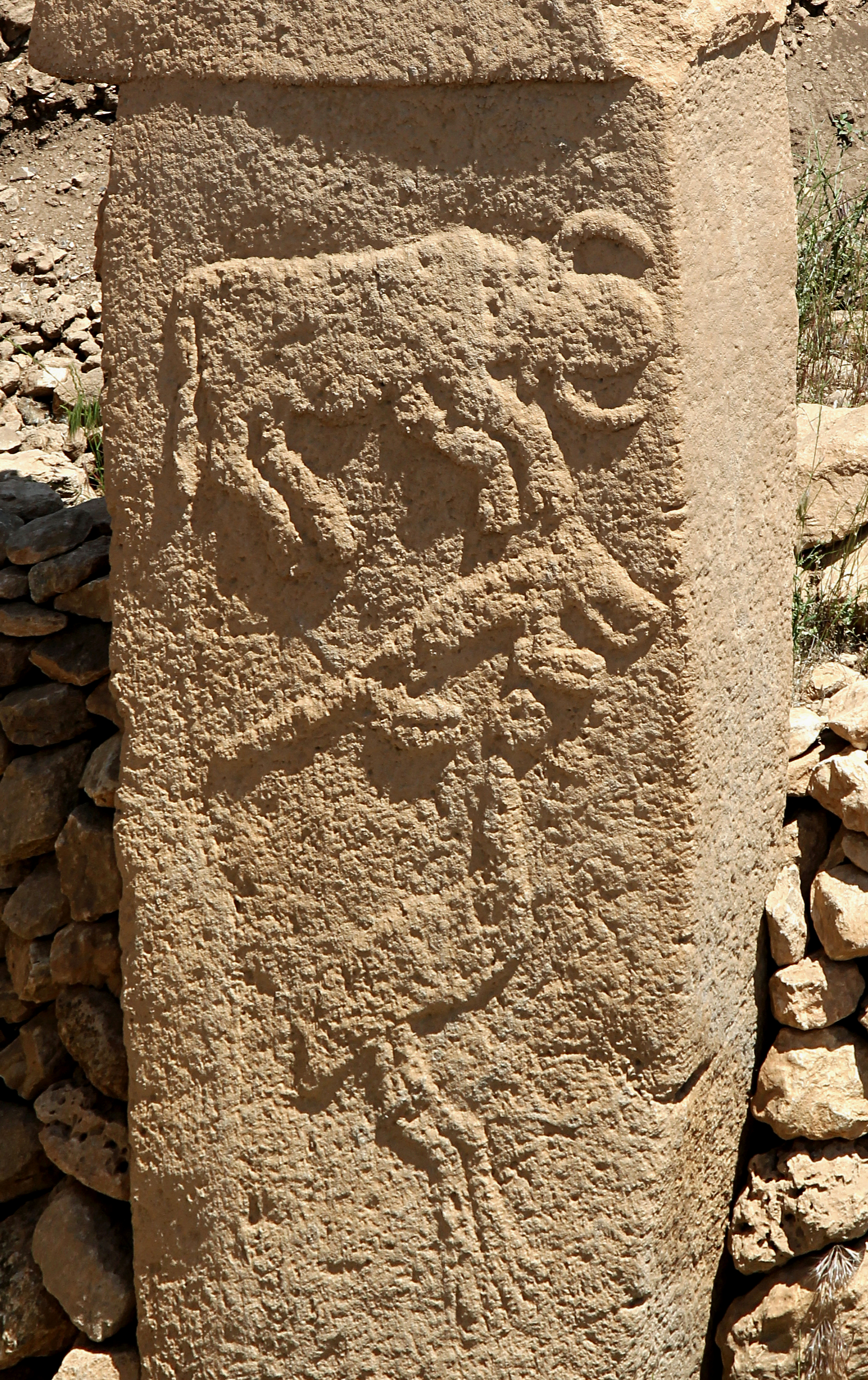
Reliefs of animals, Göbekli Tepe Layer III (Pre-Pottery Neolithic A), c. 9000 BCE.

PPNA archaeological sites are much larger than those of the preceding Natufian hunter-gatherer culture, and contain traces of communal structures, such as the famous Tower of Jericho. PPNA settlements are characterized by round, semi-subterranean houses with stone foundations and terrazzo-floors. The upper walls were constructed of unbaked clay mudbricks with plano-convex cross-sections. The hearths were small and covered with cobbles. Heated rocks were used in cooking, which led to an accumulation of fire-cracked rock in the buildings, and almost every settlement contained storage bins made of either stones or mud-brick.

As of 2013, Gesher, modern Israel, became the earliest known of all known Neolithic sites (PPNA), with a calibrated Carbon 14 date of 10,459 BCE ± 348 years, analysis suggesting that it may have been the starting point of a Neolithic Revolution. A contemporary site is Mureybet in modern Syria.

One of the most notable PPNA settlements is Jericho, thought to be the world's first town (c. 9,000 BCE). The PPNA town contained a population of up to 2–3000 people and was protected by a massive stone wall and tower. There is much debate over the function of the wall, for there is no evidence of any serious warfare at this time. One possibility is the wall was built to protect the salt resources of Jericho. It has also been proposed that the tower caught the shadow of the largest nearby mountain on summer solstice in order to create a sense of power in support of whatever hierarchy ruled the town's inhabitants.

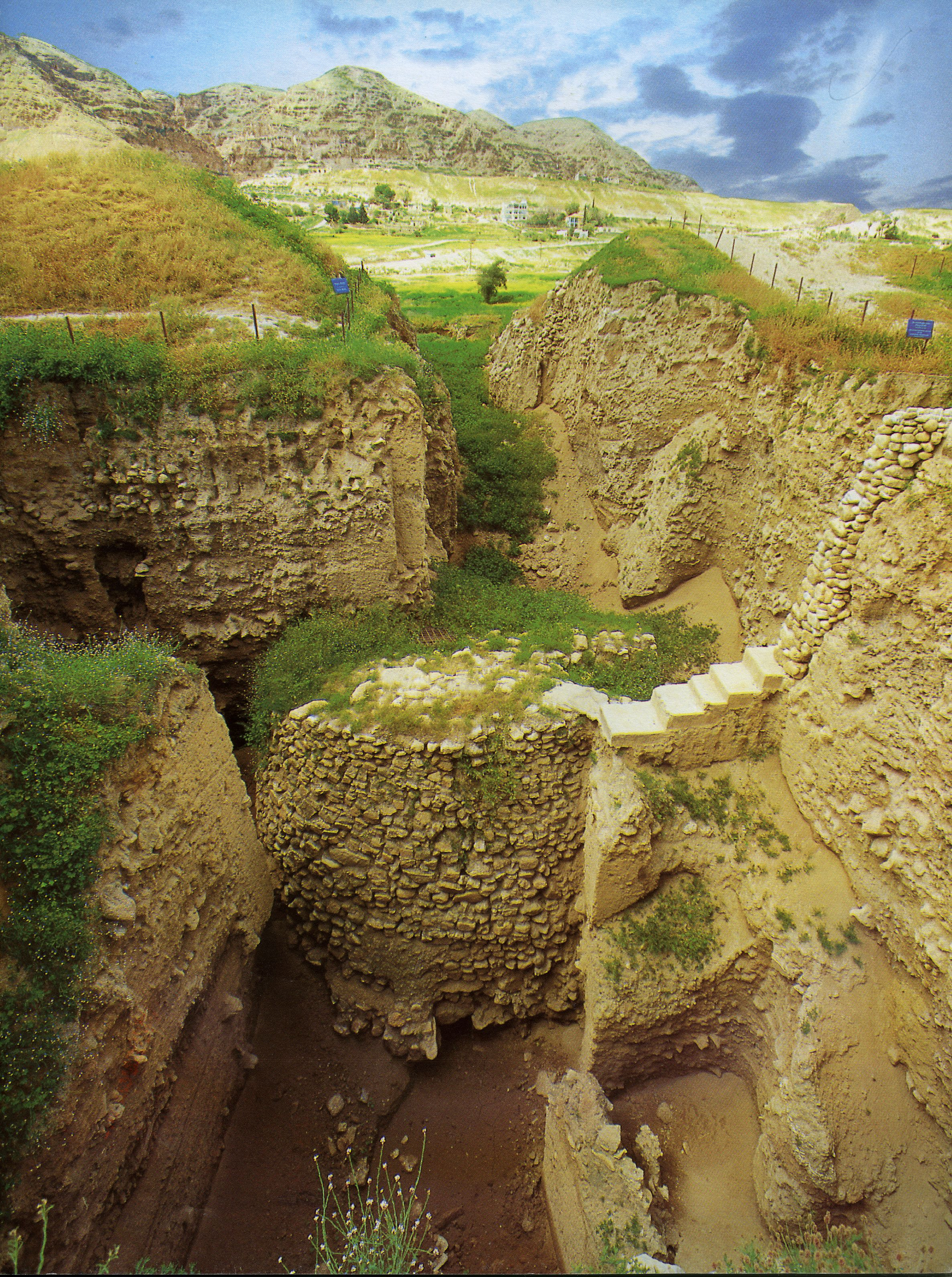
The Tower of Jericho was built at the end of Pre-Pottery Neolithic A, c. 8000 BCE.

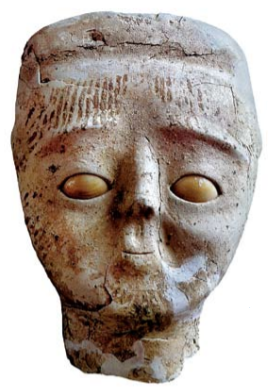
Ancestor Statue, Jericho, from c. 9000 years ago. Rockefeller Museum, Jerusalem.

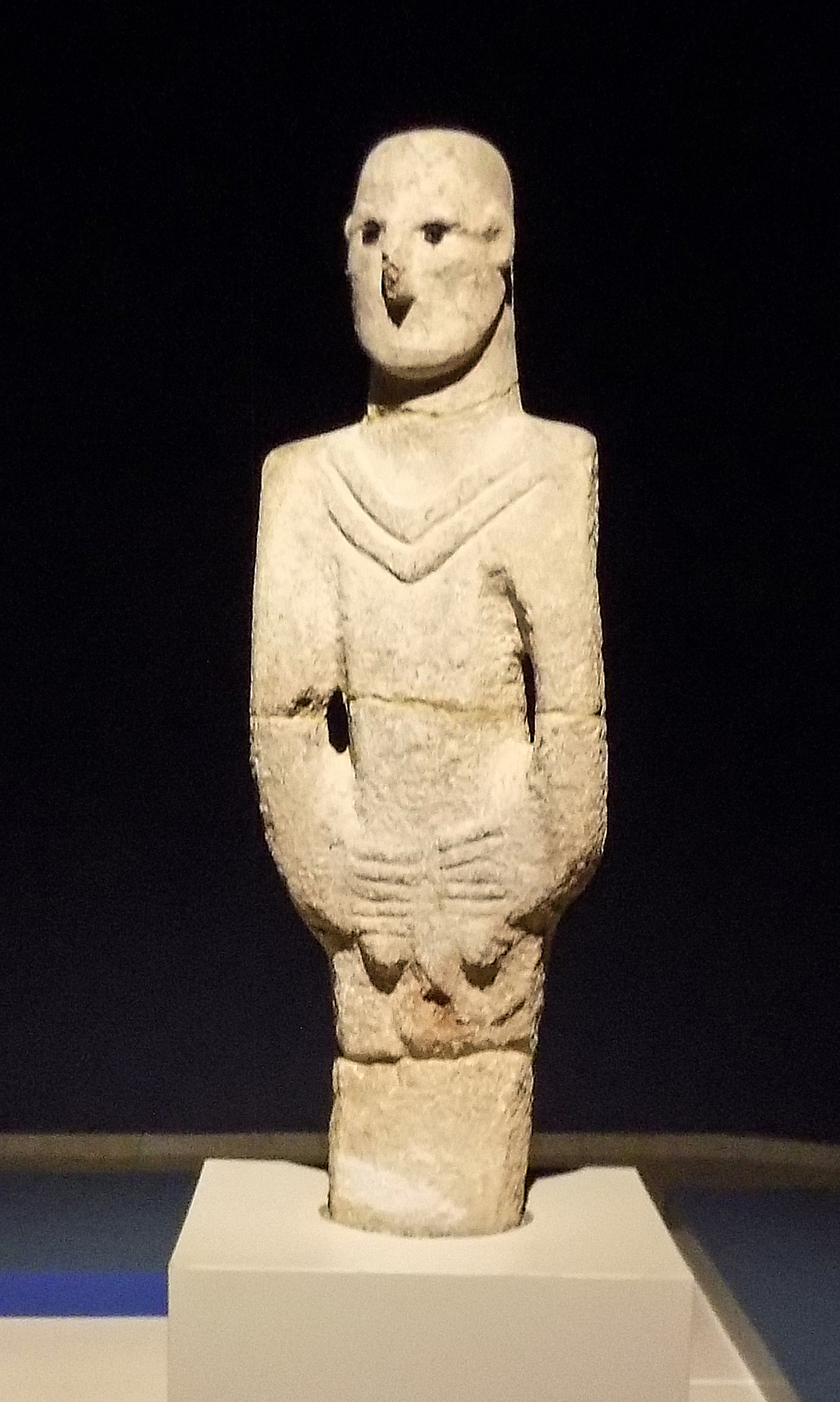
The Urfa Man c. 9000 BCE. Şanlıurfa Archaeology and Mosaic Museum.

== Burial practices ==
PPNA cultures are unique for their burial practices, and Kenyon (who excavated the PPNA level of Jericho) characterized them as "living with their dead". Kenyon found no fewer than 279 burials, below floors, under household foundations, and in between walls. In the PPNB period, skulls were often dug up and reburied, or mottled with clay and (presumably) displayed.

== Lithics ==
The lithic industry is based on blades struck from regular cores. Sickle-blades and arrowheads continue traditions from the late Natufian culture, transverse-blow axes and polished adzes appear for the first time.

== Crop cultivation and granaries ==
Map of the world showing approximate centers of the Neolithic Revolution and the spread of agriculture in prehistory: the Fertile Crescent (c. 11,000 BP), the Yangtze and Yellow River basins (c. 9,000 BP), the New Guinea Highlands (c. 9,000 – c. 6,000 BP), Central Mexico (c. 5,000 – c. 4,000 BP), Northern South America (c. 5,000 – c. 4,000 BP), sub-Saharan Africa (c. 5,000 – c. 4,000 BP, exact location unknown), eastern North America (c. 4,000 – c. 3,000 BP).

Sedentism of this time allowed for the cultivation of local grains, such as barley and wild oats, and for storage in granaries. Sites such as Dhra′ and Jericho retained a hunting lifestyle until the PPNB period, but granaries allowed for year-round occupation.

This period of cultivation is considered "pre-domestication", but may have begun to develop plant species into the domesticated forms they are today. Deliberate, extended-period storage was made possible by the use of "suspended floors for air circulation and protection from rodents". This practice "precedes the emergence of domestication and large-scale sedentary communities by at least 1,000 years".

Granaries are positioned in places between other buildings early on c. 11,500 BP, however, beginning around 10,500 BP, they were moved inside houses, and by 9,500 BP, storage occurred in special rooms. This change might reflect changing systems of ownership and property as granaries shifted from communal use and ownership to become under the control of households or individuals.

It has been observed of these granaries that their "sophisticated storage systems with subfloor ventilation are a precocious development that precedes the emergence of almost all of the other elements of the Near Eastern Neolithic package—domestication, large scale sedentary communities, and the entrenchment of some degree of social differentiation". Moreover, "building granaries may [...] have been the most important feature in increasing sedentism that required active community participation in new life-ways".

== Regional variants ==
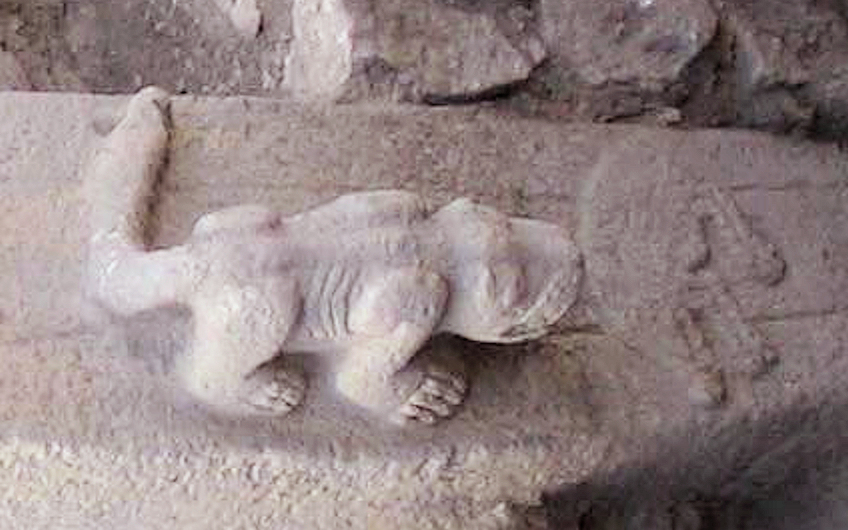
Göbekli Tepe animal sculpture, c. 9000 BCE

With more sites becoming known, archaeologists have defined a number of regional variants of Pre-Pottery Neolithic A:

- (Aswadian) in the Damascus Basin, defined by finds from Tell Aswad IA; typical: bipolar cores, big sickle blades, Aswad points. The 'Aswadian' variant recently was abolished by the work of Danielle Stordeur in her initial report from further investigations in 2001–2006. The PPNB horizon was moved back at this site, to around 10,700 BP.
- The Khiamian in the Levant is characterized by notched stone arrowheads known as El Khiam points.
- Mureybetian in the Northern Levant, defined by the finds from Mureybet IIIA, IIIB, typical: Helwan points, sickle-blades with base amenagée or short stem and terminal retouch. Other sites include Sheyk Hasan and Jerf el Ahmar.
- Sultanian in the Jordan River valley and southern Levant, with the type site of Jericho. Other sites include Netiv HaGdud, El-Khiam, Hatoula, and Nahal Oren.
- Sites in "Upper Mesopotamia" include Çayönü and Göbekli Tepe, with the latter possibly being the oldest ritual complex yet discovered.
- Sites in central Anatolia that include the 'mother city' Çatalhöyük and the smaller, but older site, rivaling even Jericho in age, Aşıklı Höyük.

== See also ==
- History of pottery in the Southern Levant
- Meltwater pulse 1B
