= Danielle Stordeur =

French archaeologist

Danielle Stordeur is a French Archaeologist and Directeur de Recherche at the CNRS. She is also Director of the French Ministry of Foreign Affairs permanent mission to El Kowm-Mureybet (Syria), replacing Jacques Cauvin in 1993 until 2010, when Frédéric Abbès took over her position.

== Positions held ==
- Member of the Editorial Committee of 'La Revue Syria' and BAH publications.
- Member of the Editorial Committee of 'La Revue Neo-Lithics'.

== Fieldwork ==
- 1978–1987 Excavations at El Kowm
- 1989–1993 Excavations at Qdeir
- 1995–1999 Excavations at Jerf el Ahmar
- 2001–2007 Excavations at Tell Aswad

== Bibliography ==
(Principal Publications)

- STORDEUR D., Les aiguilles à chas au Paléolithique, Paris, C.N.R.S., (XIIIe supplément à Gallia Préhistoire), 1979.
- STORDEUR D. (éd.), La main et l’outil. Manches et emmanchements préhistoriques, Table ronde C.N.R.S., nov. 1984, Lyon, Maison de l’Orient, TMO n° 15, 2000.
- STORDEUR D., Outils et armes en os du gisement natoufien de Mallaha (Eynan, Israel), Paris, Assoc. Paléorient (Mémoires et Travaux du Centre de Recherche Français de Jérusalem)., 1988.
- STORDEUR D., "Change and cultural inertia. From the analysis of data to the creation of a model", in J.C. Gardin et C.S. Peebles (eds), Representations in Archaeology (C.N.R.S. NSF Conference : New Approaches in Archaeology : semiotic, symbolic, structural, Bloomington, 1987), Indianapolis, Indiana University Press, p. 205-222., 1992.
- STORDEUR D., "Sédentaires et nomades au PPNB final dans le désert de Palmyre (Syrie)", Paléorient, 19/1, p. 187-204., 1993.
- STORDEUR D. El Kowm 2. Une île dans le désert. La fin du Néolithique précéramique dans la steppe syrienne, Paris, C.N.R.S. Editions., (éd.), 2000.
- STORDEUR D., "Jerf el Ahmar et l’émergence du Néolithique au Proche-Orient", in J. Guilaine (éd.), Premiers paysans du monde. Naissances des agricultures, Séminaire du Collège de France, Paris, Errance, p. 33-60., 2000.
- STORDEUR D., "Avant la ville : l’apport des cultures néolithiques de Syrie", in J.-C. David et M. Al Dbiyat (eds), La ville en Syrie et ses territoires : héritages et mutations (table ronde, Damas, janvier 1999), Bulletin d’Etudes Orientales, 52, p. 31-52., 2000,
- STORDEUR D., BRENET M., DER APRAHAMIAN G., ROUX J.-C., "Les bâtiments communautaires de Jerf el Ahmar et Mureybet. Horizon PPNA. Syrie", Paléorient, 26/1, p. 29-44., 2000.
- STORDEUR D., ABBES F., "Du PPNA au PPNB : mise en lumière d’une phase de transition à Jerf el Ahmar (Syrie)", Bulletin de la Société préhistorique française, 99 : 3, p. 563-595., 2002.
- STORDEUR D., "De la vallée de l’Euphrate à Chypre ? A la découverte d’indices de relations au Néolithique", in J. Guilaine et A. Le Brun (éds), Le Néolithique de Chypre (actes du colloque international de Nicosie, 17-19 mai 2001), Athènes, EFA, p. 353-371., 2003.
- STORDEUR D., "Tell Aswad. Résultats préliminaires des campagnes 2001 et 2002", Neo Lithics, 1/103, p. 7-15., 2003.
- STORDEUR D., "Des crânes surmodelés à Tell Aswad de Damascène (PPNB – Syrie)", Paléorient, 29/2, p. 109-116., 2003.
- STORDEUR D., Symboles et imaginaire des premières cultures néolithiques du Proche-Orient (haute et moyenne vallée de l’Euphrate), in J. Guilaine (ed.), Arts et symboles du Néolithique à la Protohistoire, Hommage à J. Cauvin, Paris, Errance, p. 15-37., 2003.
- HELMER D., GOURICHON L., STORDEUR D., "A l’aube de la domestication animale. Imaginaire et symbolisme animal dans les premières sociétés néolithiques du nord du Proche-Orient", 2004.
- STORDEUR D., ‘Small finds and poor babies’. Quelques objets ‘divers’ du Mureybétien de Jerf el Ahmar, in O. Aurenche, M. Le Miere, P. Sanlaville (eds), From the river to the sea. The Euphrates and the Levant. Studies in honour of L. Copeland, Oxford – Lyon, B.A.R. – Maison de l’Orient, p. 309-322., 2004.
- STORDEUR D., "Les bâtiments collectifs des premiers néolithiques de l’Euphrate. Création, standardisation et mémoire des formes architecturales", in P. Butterlin, M. Lebeau, J.Y. Monchambert, J.L. Montero-Fenollos, et B. Muller (éds), Les espaces syro-mésopotamiens. Dimensions de l'expérience humaine au Proche-Orient. Hommage offert à Jean Margueron, Bruxelles, Brepolls, Subartu 17 p. 19-31, 2006.
- STORDEUR D ., ABBES F., “From the first villages to the first cities: a permanent exhibition at the National Museum of Damascus (Syria)”, Neo-Lithics, 1-07, p. 43-47., 2007.
- STORDEUR D., JAMMOUS B., KHAWAM R., MORERO E ., "L'aire funéraire de Tell Aswad (PPNB)", in J.-L. Huot et D. Stordeur (éds), Hommage à H. de Contenson, Syria, numéro spécial, 83, p. 39-62., 2006.
- HUOT J. L., STORDEUR D . Hommage à H. de Contenson, numéro spécial, Syria, 83., (éds.), 2006,
