= Bassam Jamous =

- Known for: General Director of the Directorate General of Antiquities and Museums
- Scientific career
- Fields: Archaeology

Bassam Jamous is a Syrian archaeologist and general director of the Directorate-General of Antiquities and Museums (DGAM) in Damascus, Syria. He has held this position since 2005.
