= El Kowm (archaeological site) =

Archaeological site in Syria

- الكوم (Arabic)
- Location within Syria
- 35.15°N 38.81667°E
- Type: Cluster of tells
- Periods: Paleolithic, PPNB, Neolithic
- Cultures: Oldowan, Yabrudian, Hummalian, Mousterian
- Location: Homs Governorate, Syria

History
- Built: c. 7000 BC
- Abandoned: c. 6500 BC

Site notes
- Material: Flint, Bone
- Area: El Kowm I = 3 hectares (7.4 acres)
- Excavation dates: 1967, 1978–1987, 1997–
- Archaeologists: W.M. van Loon, R.H. Dornermann, D. Stordeur, J. Cauvin, M.C. Cauvin, L. Copeland, F.Hours, Jean Marie Le Tensorer, S. Muhesen
- Condition: Ruins
- Management: Directorate-General of Antiquities and Museums
- Public access: Yes

El Kowm or Al Kawm is a circular, 20 km (12 mi) gap in the Syrian mountains that houses a series of archaeological sites. The El Kowm oasis is located northeast of Palmyra in Syria, near Al-Sukhnah. It shows some of the longest and most important cultural sequences in the Middle East, with periods of occupation by humans for over 1 million years.

== Excavation ==
An initial 5-day sounding was made in 1967 by M.N. van Loon and R. H. Dornemann with a 3 by 50 metres (9.8 by 164.0 ft) trench at El Kowm I; a large Neolithic tell about 3 hectares (7.4 acres) in size. They categorised their findings into 5 periods; Early Neolithic (A), Middle Neolithic (B–C), Late Neolithic (D) and Post-Neolithic (E). Further excavations were made into a small outlying tell called El Kowm II by Danielle Stordeur between 1978 and 1987 by the French Ministry of Foreign Affairs permanent mission to El Kowm-Mureybet (Syria). The Neolithic stages at this smaller outlying tell showed one of the first places where domestic water and wastewater systems have been installed.

Further surveys and fieldwork were carried out from 1980 onwards by Jacques and M.-C. Cauvin, Lorraine Copeland, Francis Hours, Jean Marie Le Tensorer and S. Muhesen. Since 1989 further research has been carried out by the Institute for Prehistory and Archaeological Science of the University of Basel and the Department of History at the University of Damascus. These have concentrated on Paleolithic sites at El Kowm called Nadaouiyeh Aïn Askar, showing periods of inhabitation between 500,000 and 100,000 BP, and Hummal, showing evidence of human inhabitation of over 1 million years through the Oldowan and Hummalian blade industry periods. Another period was identified under the Yabrudian levels that has been tentatively named as Tayacian.

== Major discoveries ==
In 1996, a 450,000-year-old skull fragment of Homo erectus was discovered in an Acheulean level of the Old Paleolithic at Nadaouiyeh Aïn Askar. It has been described as one of the most important human skull fragments in the Middle East showing Far-Eastern features and giving us valuable knowledge about early human migration and origins.

In 2005, the team from the University of Basel found over forty fossilized bone fragments from a mammoth camel dating as far back as 150,000 years at the Hummal site in El Kowm, a new species of camelid. The giant camel was thought to be twice the size of a modern camel. It was found along with human remains, and is known as the "Syrian camel".

== Culture ==
Natural springs clearly cluster around the southwest and northern rim of the plateau have sustained permanent settlements in the steppe. The inhabitants are thought to have hunted gazelles, equids and camelids. Vegetation was only possible for short periods in the Middle and Upper Pleistocene. Many stone tools and artefacts such as hand axes and arrowheads have been found and analysed. The site was abandoned prior to 11000 BC, and then re-occupied in the Neolithic between 7000 and 6500 BC with a large sedentary settlement. Houses were well built and compartmentalised, many of which included gutters between rooms with holes to drain water out of the buildings. Art was found in the form of a painted fresco with equids on a plaster vessel. Comparisons of the Neolithic level culture have been made with Tell Abu Hureyra and Bouqras.

== Agriculture and irrigation ==
Paleobotanical samples were analysed by Willem van Zeist who concluded that Emmer wheat and hard wheat had been cultivated since the earliest Neolithic stage at El Kowm I dating to c. 6300 BC. Danielle Stordeur excavated El Kowm II more recently and dated this to the Neolithic as far back as c. 7000 BC. Van Zeist suggested that some form of irrigation may have been employed at El Kowm I and the excavators at El Kowm II tentatively agreed with the hypothesis. Stordeur suggested that whilst the nearby settlement of Qdeir showed more nomadic features, El Kowm I and El Kowm II showed no signs of short term settlement. They suggesting the inhabitants could have made simple channels from the local springs to water the fields using a simple gravity system to deal with irregular rainfall patterns. This type of early irrigation is similar to that suggested to have been employed at Jericho. Jacques Cauvin has also suggested El Kowm as a possible location for the invention of irrigation.
