= Jerf el Ahmar =

Archaeological site in Syria

- Jerf el Ahmar located in the Fertile Crescent, c. 7500 BC

- Location within Near East Location within Syria
- 36°23′0″N 38°10′50″E
- Type: Settlement
- Location: Aleppo, Syria

History
- Built: c. 9500 BC
- Abandoned: c. 8700 BC

Site notes
- Excavation dates: 1995-1999
- Archaeologists: Danielle Stordeur

Jerf el Ahmar (Arabic: الجرف الأحمر) (Note: Jerf el Ahmar means "red cliff".) is a Neolithic site in northern Syria, which dated back between 9500 and 8700 BC.

== History ==
Jerf el Ahmar contained a sequence of round and rectangular buildings, which is currently flooded by the Euphrates Lake following the construction of the Tishrin Dam. For five centuries, the site was shaped by the Mureybet culture, which had artifacts such as flint weapons and decorated small stones. The first transitions to agriculture in the region could be observed by the discovery of wild barley and einkorn. The first evidence of lentil domestication appears in the early Neolithic at Jerf el Ahmar.
