= Mureybet =

Archaeological site under Euphrates Lake in Raqqa, Syria

- مريبط (Arabic)
- Location within Near East Location within Syria
- 36.0434°N 38.1287°E
- Type: Settlement
- Periods: Natufian, Pre-Pottery Neolithic A, Pre-Pottery Neolithic B
- Location: Euphrates Lake, Raqqa, Syria

History
- Built: c. 10,200 BC
- Abandoned: c. 9500 BC

Site notes
- Height: 6 m (20 ft)
- Width: 75 m (246 ft)
- Excavation dates: 1964, 1965, 1971-1974
- Archaeologists: M. N. van Loon, Jacques Cauvin
- Condition: flooded by the Euphrates Lake
- Public access: no

Mureybet (Arabic: مريبط, romanized: muraybaṭ, lit. 'covered') is a tell, or ancient settlement mound, located on the west bank of the Euphrates in Raqqa Governorate, northern Syria. The site was excavated between 1964 and 1974 and has since disappeared under the rising waters of Euphrates Lake. Mureybet was occupied between 10,200 and 8000 BC and is the eponymous type site for the Mureybetian culture, a subdivision of the Pre-Pottery Neolithic A (PPNA). In its early stages, Mureybet was a small village occupied by hunter-gatherers. Hunting was important and crops were first gathered and later cultivated, but they remained wild. During its final stages, domesticated animals were also present at the site.

== History of research ==
The first archaeological investigation of the site was carried out in 1964. In that year, the site was noted during an archaeological survey of the region directed by Maurits N. van Loon of the Oriental Institute of the University of Chicago, and a small sounding was made. In 1965, a more extensive excavation was carried out, again under the direction of Van Loon. Between 1971 and 1974, work on the site was resumed by a team of the French Centre national de la recherche scientifique (CNRS) directed by Jacques Cauvin. All excavations were part of the larger international – and eventually UNESCO-coordinated – effort to investigate as many archaeological sites as possible in the area that would be flooded by Euphrates Lake, the reservoir of the Tabqa Dam, which was being built at that time. The filling of Euphrates Lake eventually led to the flooding of Mureybet in 1976. Although the site is now submerged and no longer accessible, the material that has been retrieved during the excavations continues to generate new research. This material is currently stored at the National Museum of Aleppo and the Antenne d'Archéorient de Jalès in Berrias-Casteljau in France.

== Mureybet and its environment ==
Mureybet was at the northern end of the area of Natufian culture (12,000 to 9500 BC), not far from Tell Abu Hureyra.

Mureybet is located in modern-day Raqqa Governorate in northern Syria. It is situated on an elongated ridge that is c. 4 metres (13 ft) above the river terrace of the Euphrates, which flowed directly west of the site before the valley was flooded. Mureybet is a tell, or ancient settlement mound, measuring 75 metres (246 ft) in diameter and 6 metres (20 ft) high.

Climate and environment of Mureybet during the time of its occupation were very different from the modern situation. When Mureybet became occupied around 10,200 BC, climate was slightly colder and more humid than today, an effect of the onset of the Younger Dryas climate change event. Annual precipitation increased slightly from 230 millimetres (9.1 in) during the Natufian to 280 millimetres (11 in) during the Mureybetian occupation phases. The vegetation consisted of an open forest steppe with species like terebinths, almonds and wild cereals.

== Occupation history ==
The excavations have revealed four occupation phases I–IV, ranging from the Natufian up to the Middle Pre-Pottery Neolithic B (PPNB) and dating to 10,200–8000 BC, based on AMS radiocarbon dates. Phase IA (10,200–9700 BC) represents the Natufian occupation of Mureybet. It is characterized by hearths and cooking pits, but no dwelling structures have been identified. Among the crops that were harvested, and possibly even locally cultivated, were barley and rye. Very few sickle blades and querns were found. The inhabitants of Mureybet hunted gazelle and equids and fishing was also important. They had dogs, evidence for which is indirect at Mureybet but bones of which have been identified at nearby and contemporary Tell Abu Hureyra.

Phases IB, IIA and IIB (9700–9300 BC) make up the Khiamian, a poorly understood and sometimes disputed sub-phase straddling the transition from the Natufian to the Pre-Pottery Neolithic A (PPNA). Mureybet is the only site where Khiamian deposits are associated with architectural remains. The oldest of these remains date to phase IB and consist of a round semi-subterranean structure with a diameter of 6 metres (20 ft). In the subsequent phases, slightly smaller round houses built at ground level also appeared, at least some of which were used simultaneously. The walls were built from compacted earth, sometimes reinforced with stones. Hearths and cooking pits were located outside the buildings. Harvested crops included barley, rye and Polygonum. Sickle blades and grinding stones are more common and show more use-wear, indicating that cereals became a more important component in the diet. The fauna at Mureybet changed significantly during phase IIB. Gazelle makes up 70% of the assemblage and small animals decrease in importance, although fish remained important. Toward the end of the Khiamian, equid hunting gained importance at the expense of gazelle.

Area of the Fertile Crescent, circa 7500 BC, with main sites of the Pre-Pottery Neolithic period. Only northwestern and northern Mesopotamia were occupied, and central and southern Mesopotamia, with insufficient natural rainfall, were not yet settled by humans.

Phases IIIA and IIIB (9300–8600 BC) represent the Mureybetian, a subphase of the PPNA that was named after Mureybet and is found in the area of the Middle Euphrates. Architecture diversified, with rectangular, multi-cellular buildings appearing next to the round buildings that were already known from the previous phases. Walls were built from cigar-shaped stones that were created by percussion and that were covered with earth. Semi-subterranean structures also continued to be used and they are compared to similar structures found at nearby and contemporary Jerf el Ahmar, where the structures are interpreted as special buildings with a communal function. Many rooms in the rectangular structures were so small that they could only have served for storage. Hearths and cooking pits lined with stones continued to be located in the outdoor areas. The wild varieties of barley, rye and einkorn were consumed in phase III. Different lines of evidence suggest that these cereals were cultivated rather than gathered. Hunting of equids and aurochs was more important than of gazelle, while fish remains were rare in phase III contexts. Based on use-wear analysis, it could also be established that animal hides were processed at the site using bone and stone tools. The earliest known writing for record keeping evolved from a system of counting using small clay tokens. The earliest use of small clay tokens for counting were found in phase III. It coincided with a period of explosive rapid growth of the use of cereals in the Near East.

The last occupation phases, IVA (8600–8200 BC) and IVB (8200–8000 BC) date to the Early and Middle PPNB, respectively. No architecture has been encountered in phase IVA. No domesticated cereals were found, but this may be an effect of very small archaeobotanical sample that was retrieved from these phases. Hunting focused on equids, followed by aurochs. It could not be determined whether any domesticated animals were exploited in Mureybet. Mud-built walls of rectangular structures were uncovered in phase IVB. Domesticated sheep and goat were exploited in this period, and domesticated cattle may also have been present.

== Material culture ==
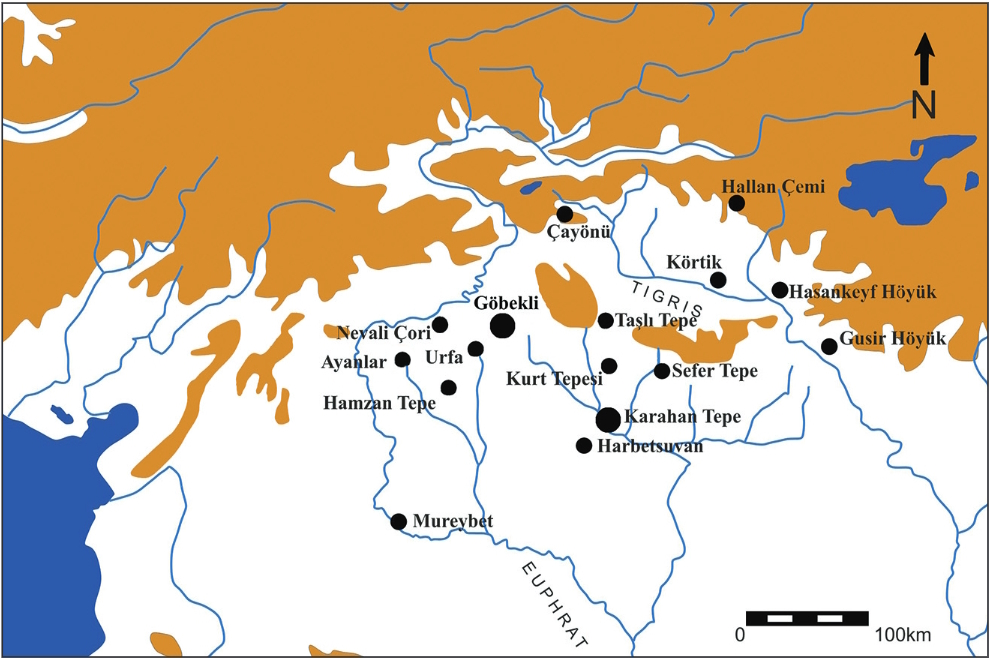
Main Upper Mesopotamian Pre-Pottery Neolithic centers, with Tell Mureybet

The excavation of Mureybet has produced an abundance of lithic material. During all periods, flint was the main raw material from which tools were made. It was procured from local sources. Obsidian was much less common. Natufian tools include points, burins, scrapers, borers and herminettes, a kind of tool that was primarily used for woodwork. Flint arrowheads appeared in the Khiamian period. Other stone tools included burins, end-scrapers and borers. Mureybetian stone tools included Mureybet arrowheads, scrapers and burins, while borers were much less common. During the PPNB phase, Byblos arrowheads replaced the Mureybetian types, and other technological improvements were also introduced.

Apart from the lithics, other artefact categories were also present in Mureybet in smaller quantities. Personal ornaments in the Natufian period consisted of pierced shells and small stone and shell discs. Only a few bone tools were found. During the Khiamian, bone was used for needles, awls and axe sheaths. Beads were made from stone, freshwater shells and bone. Among the three figurines from this phase was one with clear anthropomorphic characteristics. The Mureybetian bone tool assemblage closely resembled its Khiamian predecessor. The presence of baskets at Mureybet has been inferred from use-wear analysis on flint and bone tools. Other artifact categories include limestone vessels, stone querns, beads, pendants, including one from ivory and eight anthropomorphic figurines made from limestone and baked earth. Seven of these figurines could be identified as women.

== See also ==
- History of Mesopotamia
- Rescue excavations in the Tishrin Dam Reservoir region
- Göbekli Tepe

== Bibliography ==
- Bounni, Adnan (1977), "Campaign and exhibition from the Euphrates in Syria", The Annual of the American Schools of Oriental Research, 44: 1–7, JSTOR 3768538
- Calley, S. (1984), "Le débitage natoufien de Mureybet: étude préliminaire" (PDF), Paléorient (in French), 10 (2): 35–48, doi:10.3406/paleo.1984.938
- Cauvin, Jacques (1977), "Les fouilles de Mureybet (1971-1974) et leur signification pour les origines de la sedentarisation au Proche-Orient", The Annual of the American Schools of Oriental Research (in French), 44: 19–48, JSTOR 3768538
- Ibáñez, Juan José (2008a), "Introduction", in Ibáñez, Juan José (ed.), Le site néolithique de Tell Mureybet (Syrie du Nord). En hommage à Jacques Cauvin, BAR International Series (in French), vol. 1843, Oxford: Archaeopress, pp. 7–13, hdl:10261/9796, ISBN 978-1-4073-0330-7
- Ibáñez, Juan José (2008b), "Conclusion", in Ibáñez, Juan José (ed.), Le site néolithique de Tell Mureybet (Syrie du Nord). En hommage à Jacques Cauvin, BAR International Series, vol. 1843, Oxford: Archaeopress, pp. 661–675, hdl:10261/9794, ISBN 978-1-4073-0330-7
- Roux, J.C.; der Aprahamian, Gérard; Brenet, Michel; Stordeur, Danielle (2000), "Les bâtiments communautaires de Jerf el Ahmar et Mureybet Horizon PPNA (Syrie)", Paléorient (in French), 26 (1): 29–44, doi:10.3406/paleo.2000.4696
- van Loon, Maurits N. (1968), "The Oriental Institute excavations at Mureybit, Syria: preliminary report on the 1965 campaign. Part I: architecture and general finds", Journal of Near Eastern Studies, 27 (4): 265–282, doi:10.1086/371975, JSTOR 543223
- Willcox, Georges; Fornite, Sandra (1999), "Impressions of wild cereal chaff in pisé from the 10th millennium uncal B.P. at Jerf et Ahmar and Mureybet: Northern Syria", Vegetation History and Archaeobotany, 8 (1–2): 21–24, doi:10.1007/BF02042838
