= Sumer =

Ancient Mesopotamian civilization from 3300 to 1900 BC

Coordinates: 32°N 46°E

Sumer (c. 3300 – c. 1900 BC)
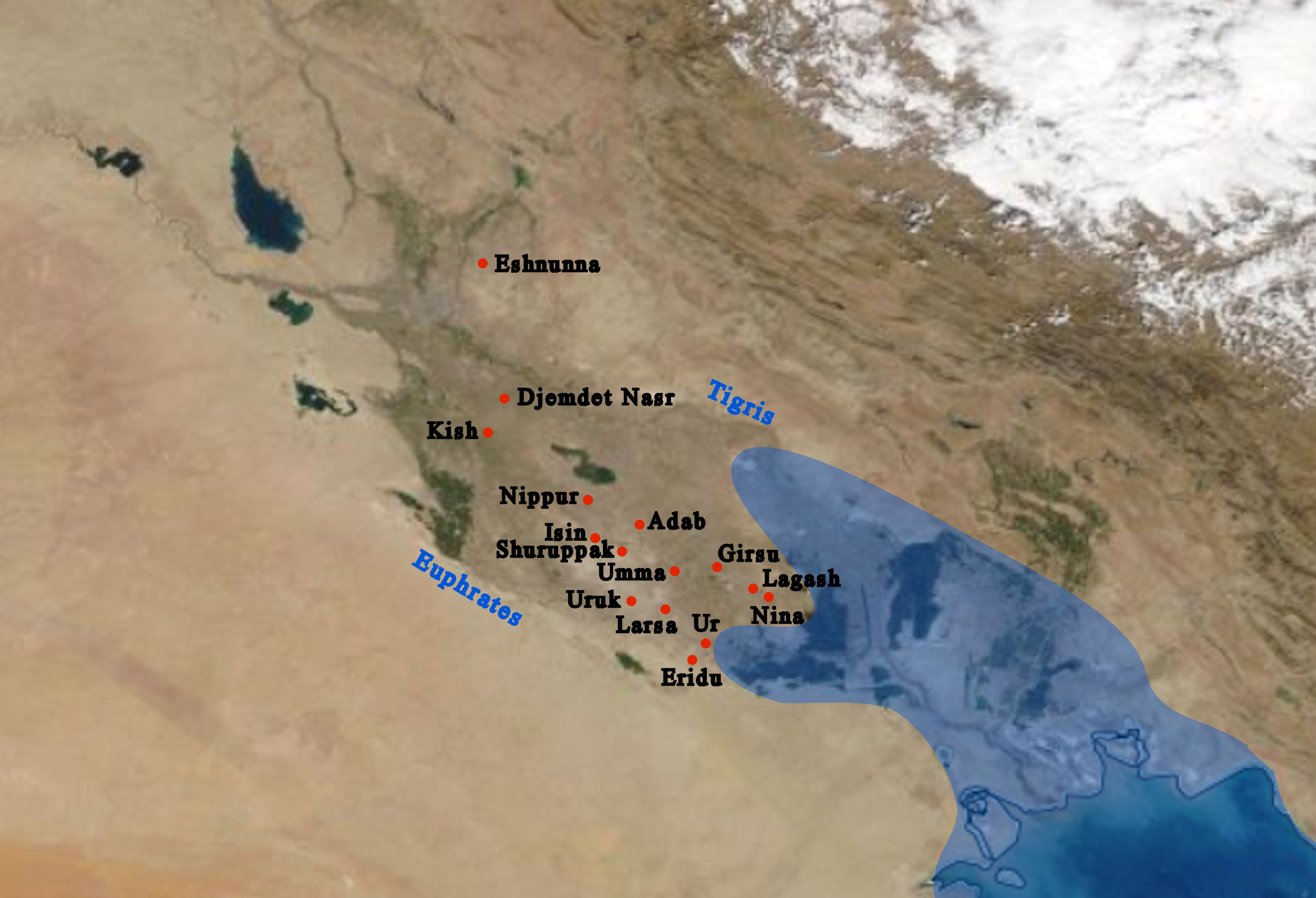
- The general location on a modern map, and main cities of Sumer with ancient coastline. The coastline nearly reached Ur in ancient times.
- Religion: Sumerian religion
- Language: Sumerian
- Geographical range: Mesopotamia, Near East, Middle East
- Period: Chalcolithic, Bronze Age
- Dates: c. 3300 – c. 1900 BC
- Preceded by: Ubaid period
- Followed by: Akkadian Empire

Sumer (/ˈsuːmər/ SOO-mər) is the earliest known civilization, located in the historical region of southern Mesopotamia (now south-central Iraq), emerging during the Chalcolithic and early Bronze Ages between the 5th and 4th millennium BC. Like nearby Elam, it is one of the cradles of civilization, along with Egypt, the Indus Valley, the Erligang culture of the Yellow River valley, Caral-Supe, and Mesoamerica. Living along the valleys of the Tigris and Euphrates rivers, Sumerian farmers grew an abundance of grain and other crops, a surplus of which enabled them to form urban settlements. The world's earliest known texts come from the Sumerian cities of Uruk and Jemdet Nasr, and date to between c. 3350 and c. 2500 BC, following a period of proto-writing c. 4000 – c. 2500 BC.

== Name ==
The term "Sumer" (Akkadian: 𒋗𒈨𒊒, romanized: šumeru) comes from the Akkadian name for the "Sumerians", the ancient non-Semitic-speaking inhabitants of southern Mesopotamia. In their inscriptions, the Sumerians called their land "Kengir", the "Country of the noble lords" (Sumerian: 𒆠𒂗𒄀, romanized: ki-en-gi(-r), lit. ''country" + "lords" + "noble''), and their language "Emegir" (Sumerian: 𒅴𒂠, romanized: eme-g̃ir or 𒅴𒄀 eme-gi_{15}).

The Akkadians, the East Semitic-speaking people who later conquered the Sumerian city-states, gave Sumer its main historical name, but the phonological development of the term šumerû is uncertain. Hebrew שִׁנְעָר Šinʿar, Egyptian Sngr, and Hittite Šanhar(a), all referring to southern Mesopotamia, could potentially be western variants of Sumer.

== Origins ==
Most historians have suggested that Sumer was first permanently settled between c. 5500 and c. 3300 BC by a West Asian people who spoke the Sumerian language (pointing to the names of cities, rivers, basic occupations, etc., as evidence), a non-Semitic and non-Indo-European agglutinative language isolate.

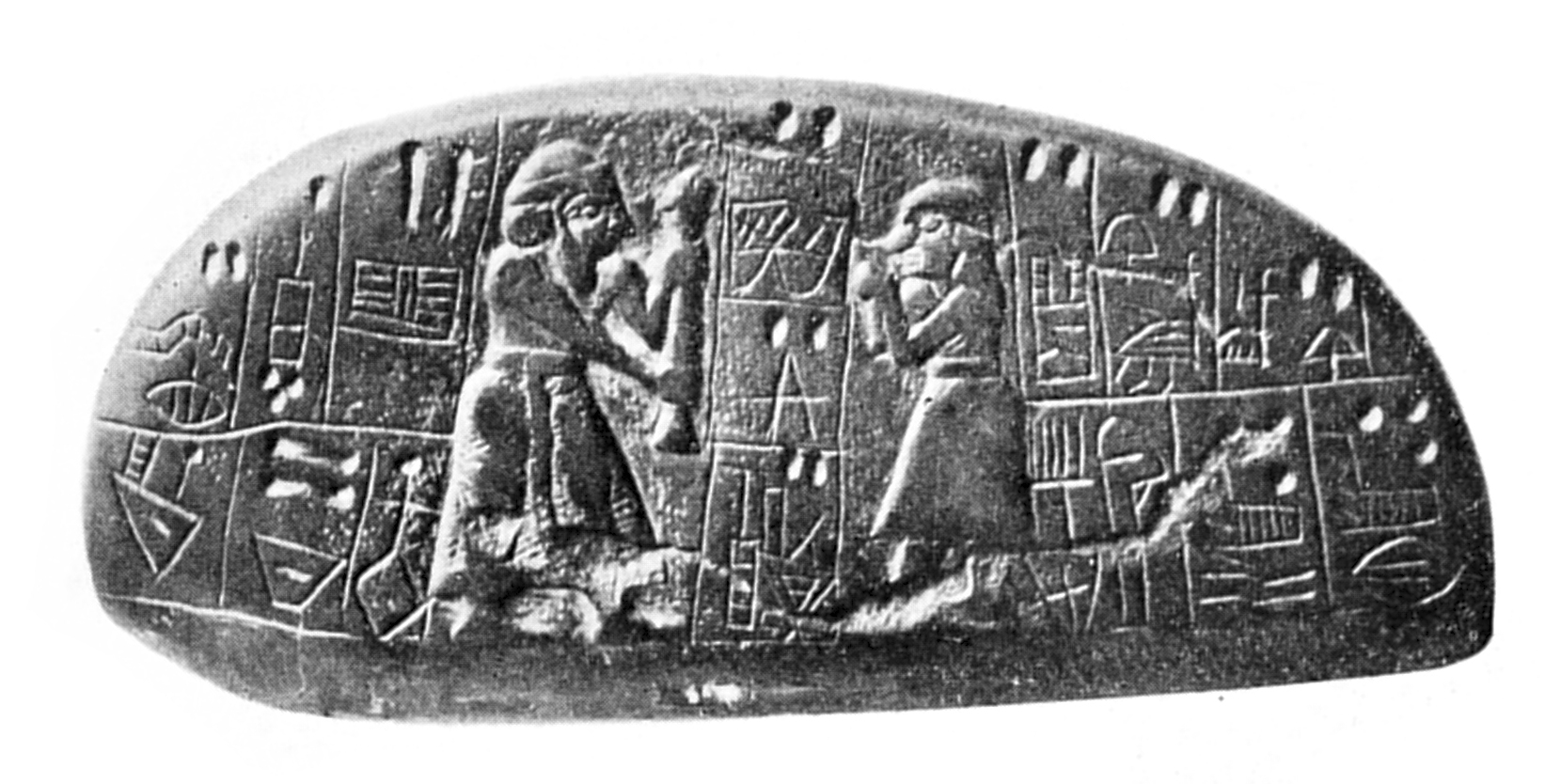
The Blau Monuments combine proto-cuneiform characters and illustrations of early Sumerians, Jemdet Nasr period, 3100–2700 BC. British Museum.

Others have suggested that the Sumerians were a North African people who migrated from the Green Sahara into the Middle East and were responsible for the spread of farming in the Middle East. However, contrary evidence strongly suggests that the first farming originated in the Fertile Crescent. Although not specifically discussing Sumerians, Lazaridis et al. 2016 have suggested a mix of basal Eurasian and western Eurasian hunter-gatherer ancestry for the pre-Semitic peoples of the fertile crescent, particularly the Natufians, after testing the genomes of Natufian and other Pre-Pottery Neolithic culture-bearers.

Some scholars associate the Sumerians with the Hurrians and Urartians, and suggest the Caucasus as their homeland. This is not generally accepted.

Anatole Klyosov suggested that the Sumerians, or their ancestors, were likely bearers of the Y-chromosome haplogroup R1b, particularly the subclades R1b1a2 and R-L23 of R-M269. According to his hypothesis, R1b-bearing populations, which he referred to as "Arbins", originated in Central Asia and migrated westward through the Eurasian steppe, the Caucasus and Anatolia toward Lower Mesopotamia, where they established the Sumerian civilization. Klyosov claims that these populations settled in Sumer around 6,000–5,000 years ago, and that modern Assyrians are their likely descendants.

Klyosov later conceded that no data on Sumerian haplotypes existed. His hypothesis of a possible R1b origin for the Sumerians is based primarily on assumed ethnogenetic relations with the Basques, who, according to him, largely belong to the R1b1b2 haplotype, and on the fact that both Sumerian and Basque are unclassified languages, placed by some linguists within the Sino-Caucasian language family.

Based on mentions of Dilmun as the "home city of the land of Sumer" in Sumerian legends and literature, other scholars have suggested the possibility that the Sumerians originated from Dilmun, which was theorized to be the island of Bahrain in the Persian Gulf. In Sumerian mythology, Dilmun was also mentioned as the home of deities such as Enki. The status of Dilmun as the Sumerians' ancestral homeland has not been established, but archaeologists have found evidence of civilization in Bahrain, namely the existence of Mesopotamian-style round disks.

A prehistoric people who lived in the region before the Sumerians have been termed the "Proto-Euphrateans" or "Ubaidians", and are theorized to have evolved from the Samarra culture of northern Mesopotamia. The Ubaidians, though never mentioned by the Sumerians themselves, are assumed by modern-day scholars to have been the first civilizing force in Sumer. They drained the marshes for agriculture, developed trade, and established industries, including weaving, leatherwork, metalwork, masonry, and pottery.

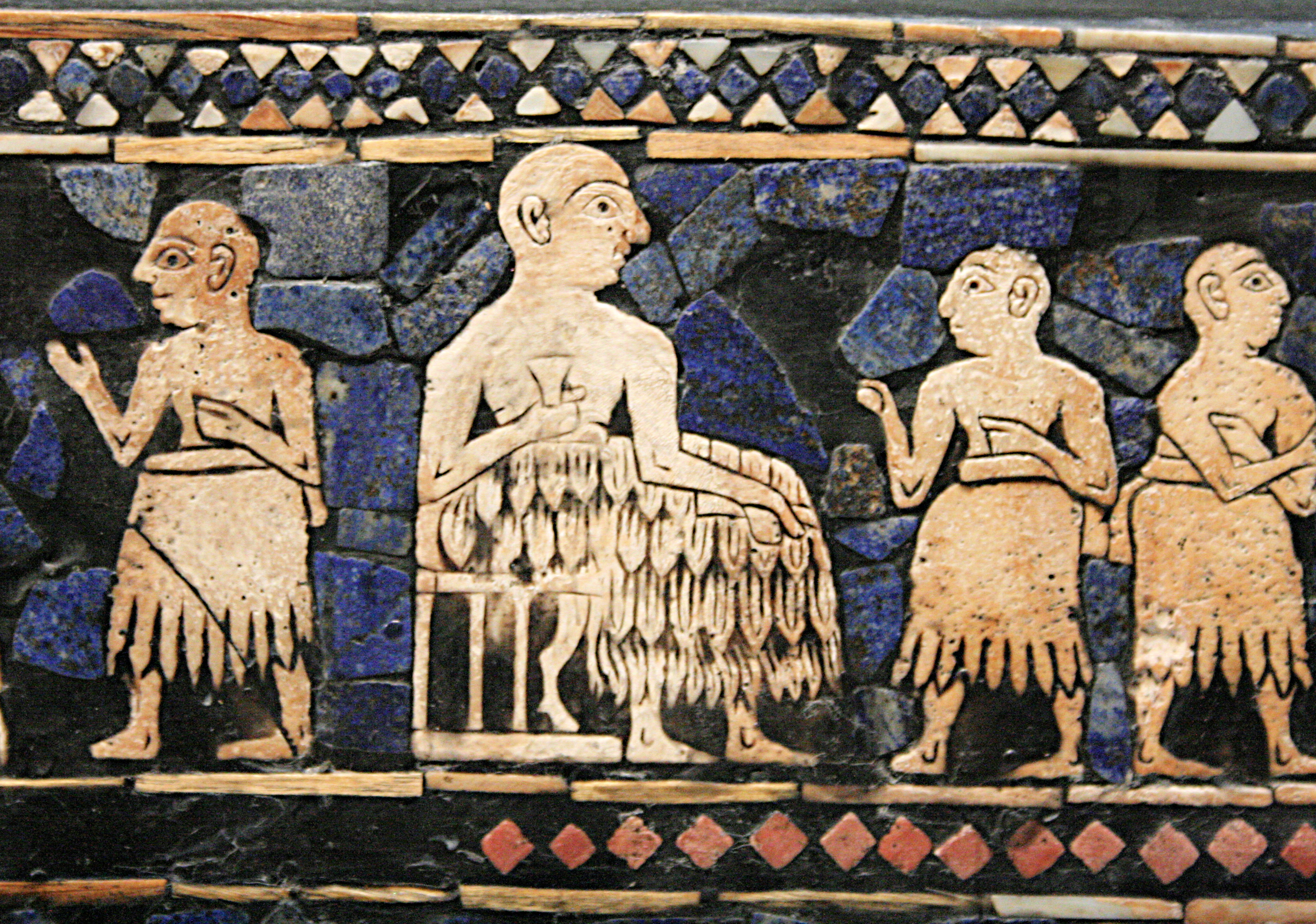
Enthroned Sumerian king of Ur, possibly Ur-Pabilsag, with attendants. Standard of Ur, c. 2600 BC.

Some scholars contest the idea of a Proto-Euphratean language or one substrate language; they think the Sumerian language may originally have been that of the hunting and fishing peoples who lived in the marshland and the Eastern Arabia littoral region and were part of the Arabian bifacial culture. Juris Zarins believes the Sumerians lived along the coast of Eastern Arabia, today's Persian Gulf region, before it was flooded at the end of the Ice Age.

Sumerian civilization took form in the Uruk period (4th millennium BC), continuing into the Jemdet Nasr and Early Dynastic periods. The Sumerian city of Eridu, on the coast of the Persian Gulf, is considered to have been one of the oldest cities, where three separate cultures may have fused: that of peasant Ubaidian farmers, living in mud-brick huts and practicing irrigation; that of mobile nomadic Semitic pastoralists living in black tents and following herds of sheep and goats; and that of fisher folk, living in reed huts in the marshlands, who may have been the ancestors of the Sumerians.

Reliable historical records begin with Enmebaragesi (Early Dynastic I). The Sumerians progressively lost control to Semitic states from the northwest. Sumer was conquered by the Semitic-speaking kings of the Akkadian Empire around 2270 BC (short chronology), but Sumerian continued as a sacred language. Native Sumerian rule re-emerged for about a century in the Third Dynasty of Ur at approximately 2100–2000 BC, but the Akkadian language also remained in use for some time.

== Archeological discovery ==
The Sumerians were entirely unknown during the early period of modern archeology. Jules Oppert was the first scholar to publish the word Sumer in a lecture on 17 January 1869. The first major excavations of Sumerian cities were in 1877 at Girsu by the French archeologist Ernest de Sarzec, in 1889 at Nippur by John Punnett Peters from the University of Pennsylvania between 1889 and 1900, and in Shuruppak by German archeologist Robert Koldewey in 1902–1903. Major publications of these finds were "Decouvertes en Chaldée par Ernest de Sarzec" by Léon Heuzey in 1884, "Les Inscriptions de Sumer et d'Akkad" by François Thureau-Dangin in 1905, and "Grundzüge der sumerischen Grammatik" on Sumerian grammar by Arno Poebel in 1923.

== City-states in Mesopotamia ==
A composite copy of a text listing cities from the late Uruk period such as: Nippur, Uruk, Ur, Eresh, Kesh, and Zabala.

In the late 4th millennium BC, Sumer was divided into many independent city-states, which were divided by canals and boundary stones. Each was centered on a temple dedicated to the particular patron god or goddess of the city and ruled over by a priestly governor (ensi) or by a king (lugal) who was intimately tied to the city's religious rites.

Anu ziggurat and White Temple
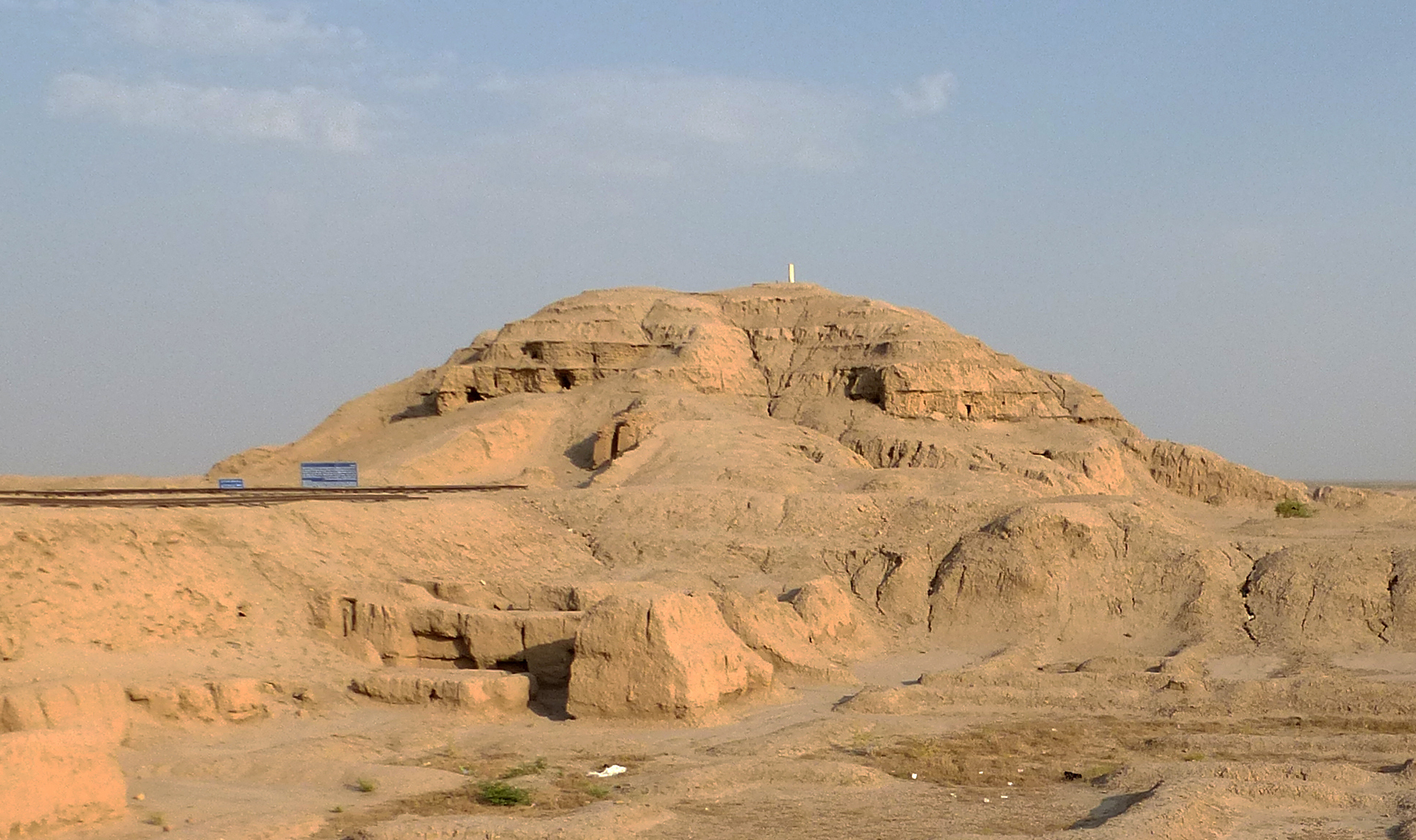
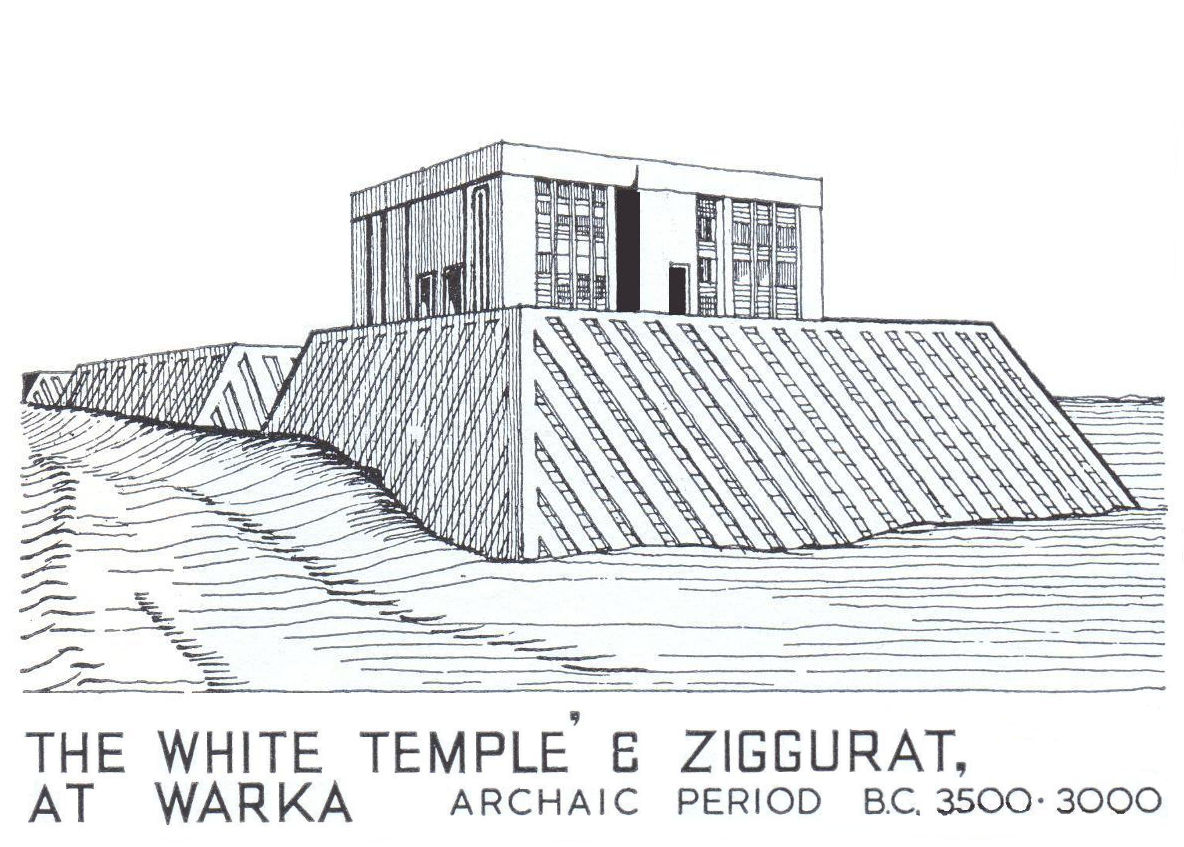
Anu ziggurat and White Temple at Uruk. The original pyramidal structure, the "Anu Ziggurat", dates to around 4000 BC, and the White Temple was built on top of it c. 3500 BC. The design of the ziggurat was probably a precursor to that of the Egyptian pyramids, the earliest of which dates to c. 2600 BC.

An incomplete list of cities that may have been visited, interacted and traded with, invaded, conquered, destroyed, occupied, colonized by and/or otherwise within the Sumerians' sphere of influence (ordered from south to north):

1. Eridu (Tell Abu Shahrain)^{SC}
2. Kuara (probably Tell al-Lahm)^{SU}
3. Ur (Tell al-Muqayyar)^{SC}
4. Kesh (possibly Tell Jidr or Tell al-Wilayah)^{SU}
5. Larsa (Tell as-Senkereh)^{S}
6. Uruk (Warka)^{SC}
7. Bad-tibira (probably Tell al-Madain)^{SC}
8. Lagash (Tell al-Hiba)^{S}
9. Girsu (Tello or Telloh)^{S}
10. Umma (Tell Jokha)^{S}
11. Zabala (Tell Ibzeikh)^{S}
12. Shuruppak (Tell Fara)^{SC}
13. Kisurra (Tell Abu Hatab)^{S}
14. Mashkan-shapir (Tell Abu Duwari)^{S}
15. Eresh (possibly Abu Salabikh) ^{SU}
16. Isin (Ishan al-Bahriyat)^{SC}
17. Adab (Tell Bismaya)^{SC}
18. Nippur (Afak)^{SH}
19. Marad (Tell Wannat es-Sadum)^{S}
20. Dilbat (Tell ed-Duleim)^{S}
21. Borsippa (Birs Nimrud)^{M}
22. Larak (possibly Tell al-Hayyad or Tell al-Wilayah)^{SCU}
23. Kish (Tell Uheimir and Ingharra)^{MC}
24. Kutha (Tell Ibrahim)^{M}
25. Sippar (Tell Abu Habbah)^{MC}
26. Der (Tell Aqar)^{M}
27. Akshak (possiblu Tell Abu Jawan, Tulul Mujaili', or Tell Rishad)^{MCU}
28. Akkad (possibly Tell Mizyad)^{MCU}
29. Eshnunna (Tell Asmar)^{M}
30. Awan (unlocated)^{ICU}
31. Mari (Tell Hariri)^{WC}
32. Hamazi (possibly Kani Jowez)^{NCU}
33. Nagar (Tell Brak)^{W}
- (^{S}a city in southern Mesopotamia)
- (^{M}an outlying city in central Mesopotamia)
- (^{N}an outlying city in northern Mesopotamia)
- (^{W}an outlying city in western Mesopotamia)
- (^{I}an outlying city in western Iran)
- (^{C}a city said on the Sumerian King List (SKL) to have exercised the Sumerian kingship)
- (^{H}a holy city)
- (^{U}a lost city)

Apart from Mari, which lies full 330 kilometres (205 miles) north-west of Agade, but which is credited in the king list as having exercised kingship in the Early Dynastic II period, and Nagar, an outpost, these cities are all in the Euphrates-Tigris alluvial plain, south of Baghdad in what are now the Bābil, Diyala, Wāsit, Dhi Qar, Basra, Al-Muthannā and Al-Qādisiyyah governorates of Iraq.

== History ==
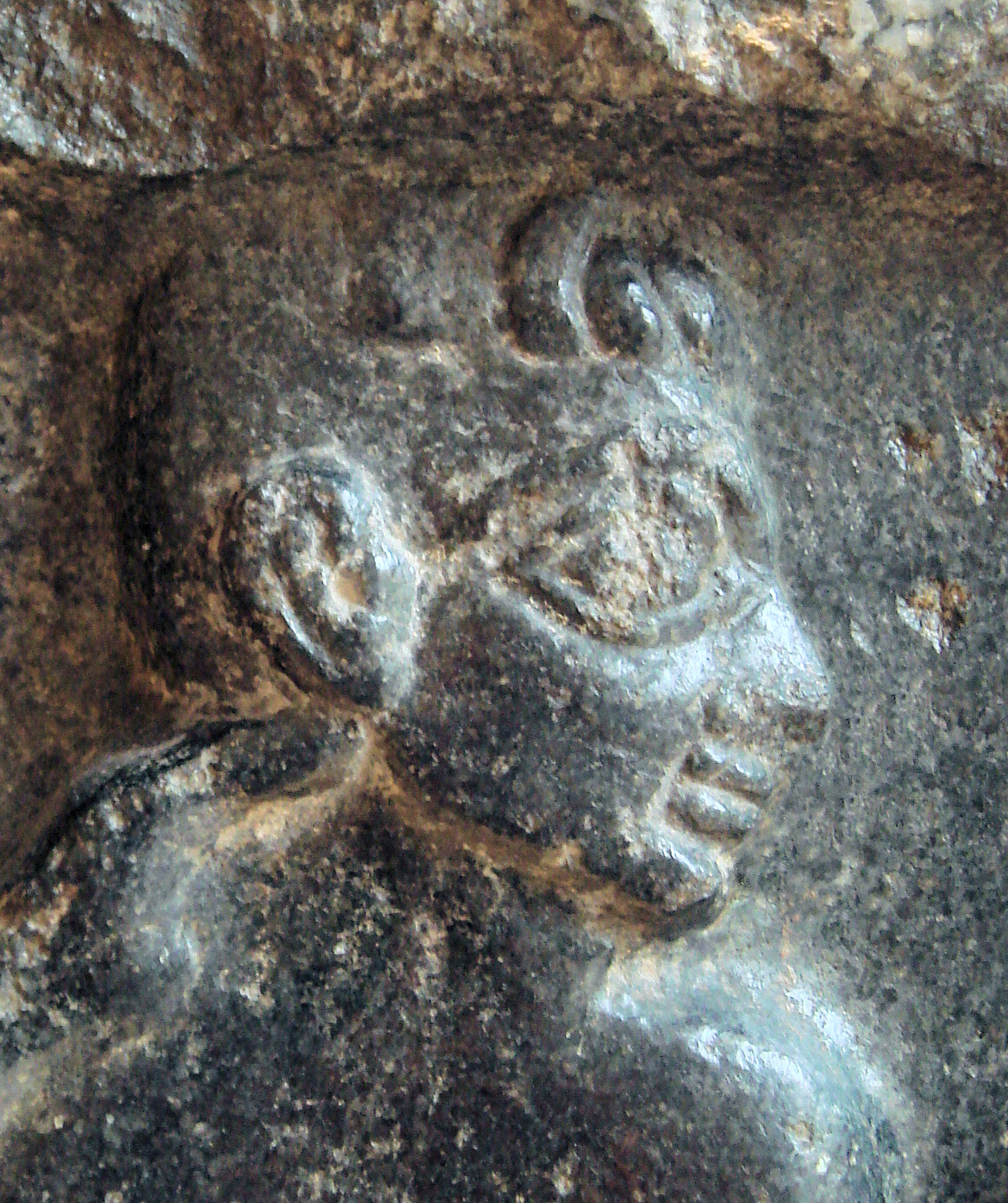
Portrait of a Sumerian prisoner on a victory stele of Sargon of Akkad, c. 2300 BC. The hairstyle of the prisoners (curly hair on top and short hair on the sides) is characteristic of Sumerians, as also seen on the Standard of Ur. Louvre Museum.

The Sumerian city-states rose to power during the prehistoric Ubaid and Uruk periods. Sumerian written history reaches back to the 27th century BC and before, but the historical record remains obscure until the Early Dynastic III period, c. 23rd century BC, when the language of the written records becomes easier to decipher, which has allowed archaeologists to read contemporary records and inscriptions.

The Akkadian Empire was the first state that successfully united larger parts of Mesopotamia in the 23rd century BC. After the Gutian period, the Ur III kingdom similarly united parts of northern and southern Mesopotamia. It ended in the face of Amorite incursions at the beginning of the second millennium BC. The Amorite "dynasty of Isin" persisted until c. 1700 BC, when Mesopotamia was united under Babylonian rule.

- New Stone Age: c. 10000 – c. 5000 BC
  - Ubaid period: c. 6500 – c. 4100 BC
- Copper Age: c. 5000 – c. 3300 BC
  - Uruk period: c. 4100 – c. 3100 BC
    - Uruk XIV–V phases: c. 4100 – c. 3300 BC
    - Uruk IV phase: c. 3300 – c. 3100 BC
- Early Bronze Age I: c. 3300 – c. 3000 BC
  - Jemdet Nasr period (Uruk III phase): c. 3100 – c. 2900 BC
    - Uruk III phase: c. 3100 – c. 2900 BC
- Early Bronze Age II: c. 3000 – c. 2700 BC
  - Early Dynastic period c. 2900 – c. 2334 BC
    - Early Dynastic I period: c. 2900 – c. 2800 BC
    - Early Dynastic II period: c. 2800 – c. 2600 BC
    - Early Dynastic IIIa period: c. 2600 – c. 2500 BC
    - Early Dynastic IIIb period: c. 2500 – c. 2334 BC
- Early Bronze Age III: c. 2700 – c. 2200 BC
  - Akkadian period: c. 2334 – c. 2154 BC
    - Akkad dynasty (Sargon)
- Early Bronze Age IV: c. 2200 – c. 2100 BC
  - Gutian period: c. 2154 – c. 2119 BC
    - Uruk IV dynasty
    - Gutian dynasty
- Middle Bronze Age I: c. 2100 – c. 2000 BC
  - Ur III period: c. 2119 – c. 2004 BC
    - Uruk V dynasty
    - Ur III dynasty
- Middle Bronze Age II A: c. 2000 – c. 1750 BC
  - Isin-Larsa period: c. 2004 – c. 1736 BC
    - Isin I dynasty
    - Larsa dynasty
- Middle Bronze Age II B: c. 1750 – c. 1650 BC
  - Old Babylonian period: c. 1736 – c. 1595 BC
    - Sealand dynasty

=== Ubaid period ===
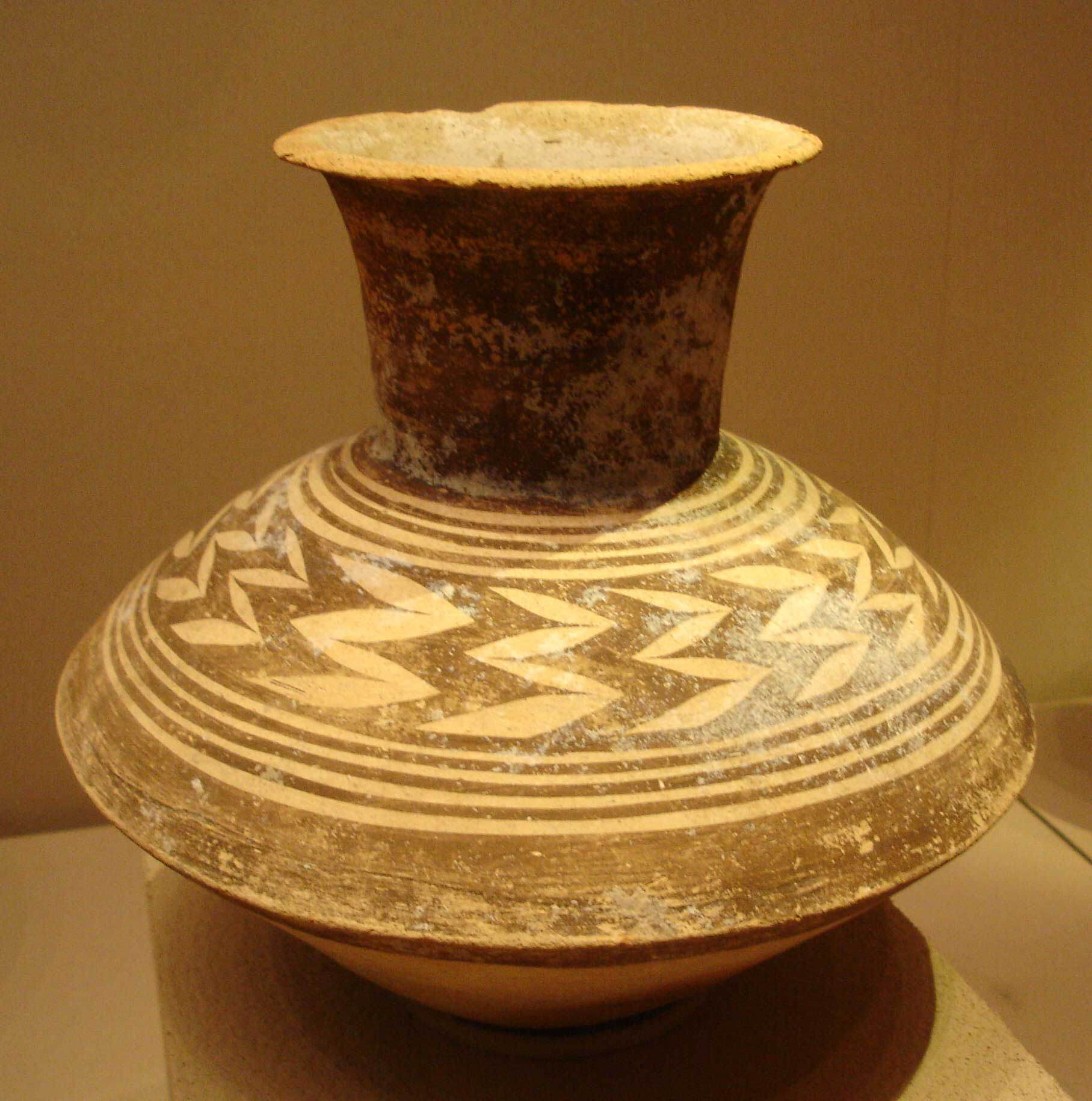
A pottery jar from the Late Ubaid Period

The Ubaid period is marked by a distinctive style of fine quality painted pottery which spread throughout Mesopotamia and the Persian Gulf. The oldest evidence for occupation comes from Tell el-'Oueili, but, given that environmental conditions in southern Mesopotamia were favourable to human occupation well before the Ubaid period, it is likely that older sites exist but have not yet been found. It appears that this culture was derived from the Samarran culture from northern Mesopotamia. It is not known whether or not these were the actual Sumerians who are identified with the later Uruk culture. The story of the passing of the gifts of civilization (me) to Inanna, goddess of Uruk and of love and war, by Enki, god of wisdom and chief god of Eridu, may reflect the transition from Eridu to Uruk.

=== Uruk period ===
The archaeological transition from the Ubaid period to the Uruk period is marked by a gradual shift from painted pottery domestically produced on a slow wheel to a great variety of unpainted pottery mass-produced by specialists on fast wheels. The Uruk period is a continuation and an outgrowth of Ubaid with pottery being the main visible change.

Uruk King-priest feeding the sacred herd

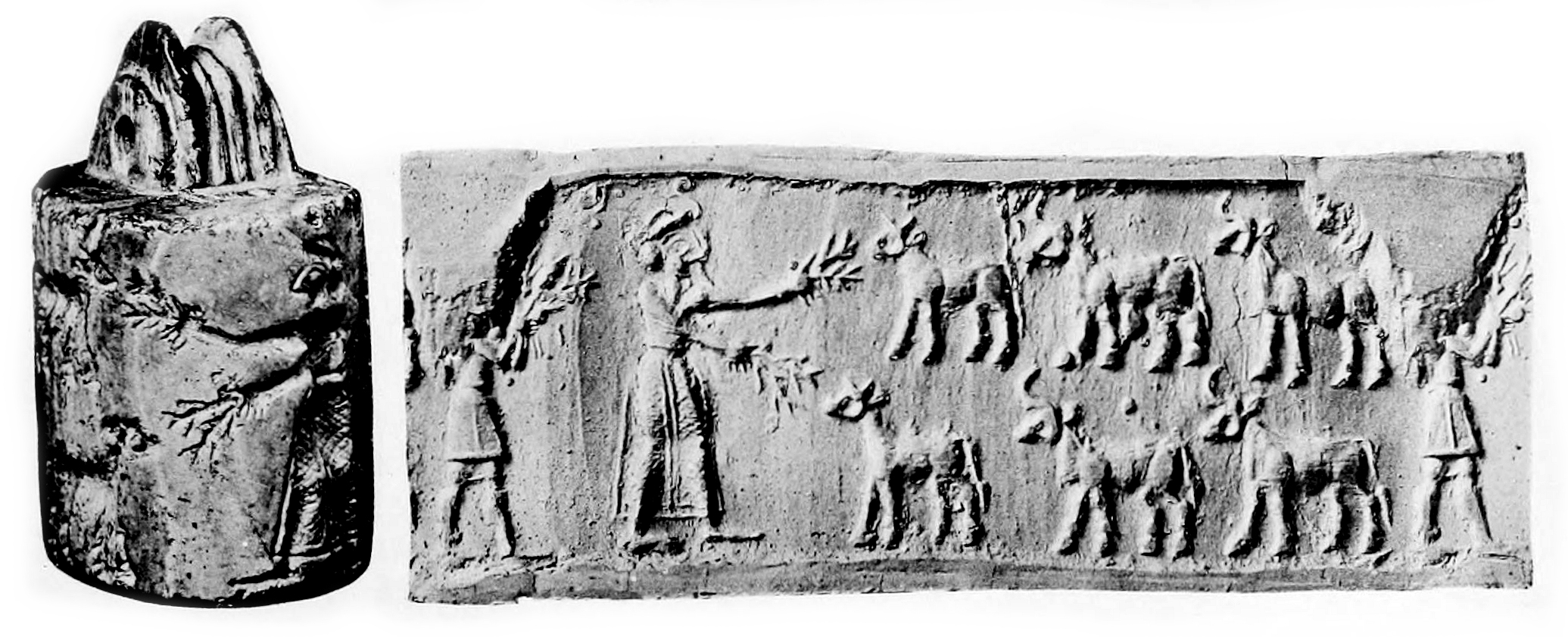
The king-priest and his acolyte feeding the sacred herd. Uruk period, c. 3200 BC

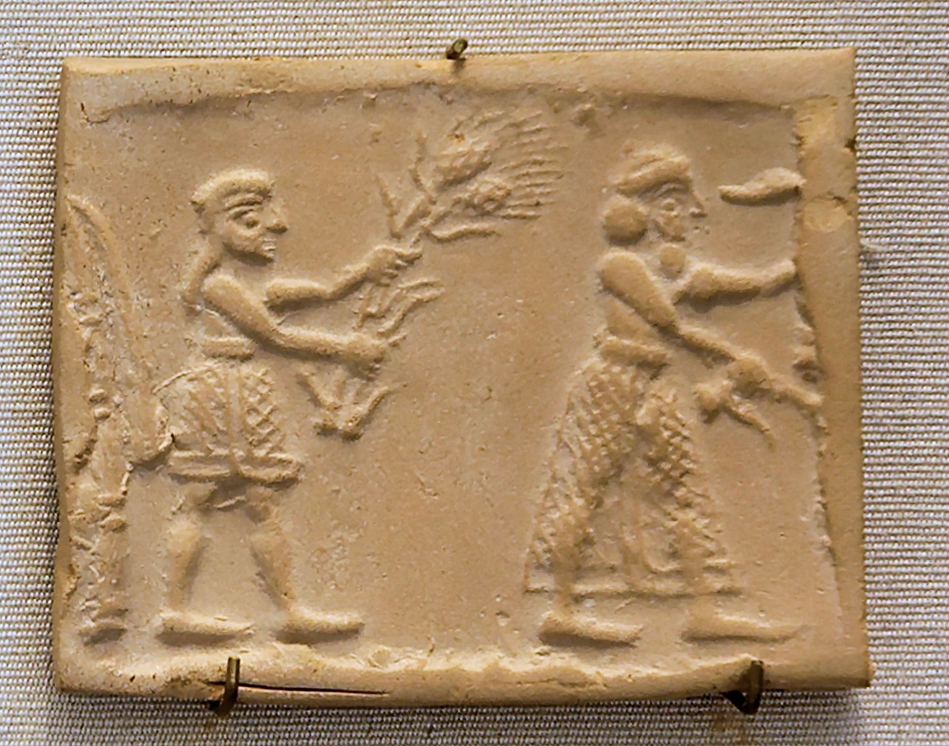
Cylinder seal of the Uruk period and its impression, c. 3100 BC – Louvre Museum

By the time of the Uruk period, c. 4100 – c. 2900 BC calibrated, the volume of trade goods transported along the canals and rivers of southern Mesopotamia facilitated the rise of many large, stratified, temple-centered cities, with populations of over 10,000 people, where centralized administrations employed specialized workers. It is fairly certain that it was during the Uruk period that Sumerian cities began to make use of slave labour captured from the hill country, and there is ample evidence for captured slaves as workers in the earliest texts. Artifacts, and even colonies of this Uruk civilization have been found over a wide area—from the Taurus Mountains in Turkey, to the Mediterranean Sea in the west, and as far east as western Iran.

The Uruk period civilization, exported by Sumerian traders and colonists, like that found at Tell Brak, had an effect on all surrounding peoples, who gradually evolved their own comparable, competing economies and cultures. The cities of Sumer could not maintain remote, long-distance colonies by military force.

Sumerian cities during the Uruk period were probably theocratic and were most likely headed by a priest-king (ensi), assisted by a council of elders, including both men and women. It is quite possible that the later Sumerian pantheon was modeled upon this political structure. There was little evidence of organized warfare or professional soldiers during the Uruk period, and towns were generally unwalled. During this period Uruk became the most urbanized city in the world, surpassing for the first time 50,000 inhabitants.

The ancient Sumerian king list includes the early dynasties of several prominent cities from this period. The first set of names on the list is of kings said to have reigned before a major flood occurred. These early names may be fictional, and include some legendary and mythological figures, such as Alulim and Dumuzid.

The end of the Uruk period coincided with the Piora oscillation, a dry period from c. 3200 – c. 2900 BC that marked the end of a long wetter, warmer climate period from about 9,000 to 5,000 years ago, called the Holocene climatic optimum.

=== Early Dynastic Period ===
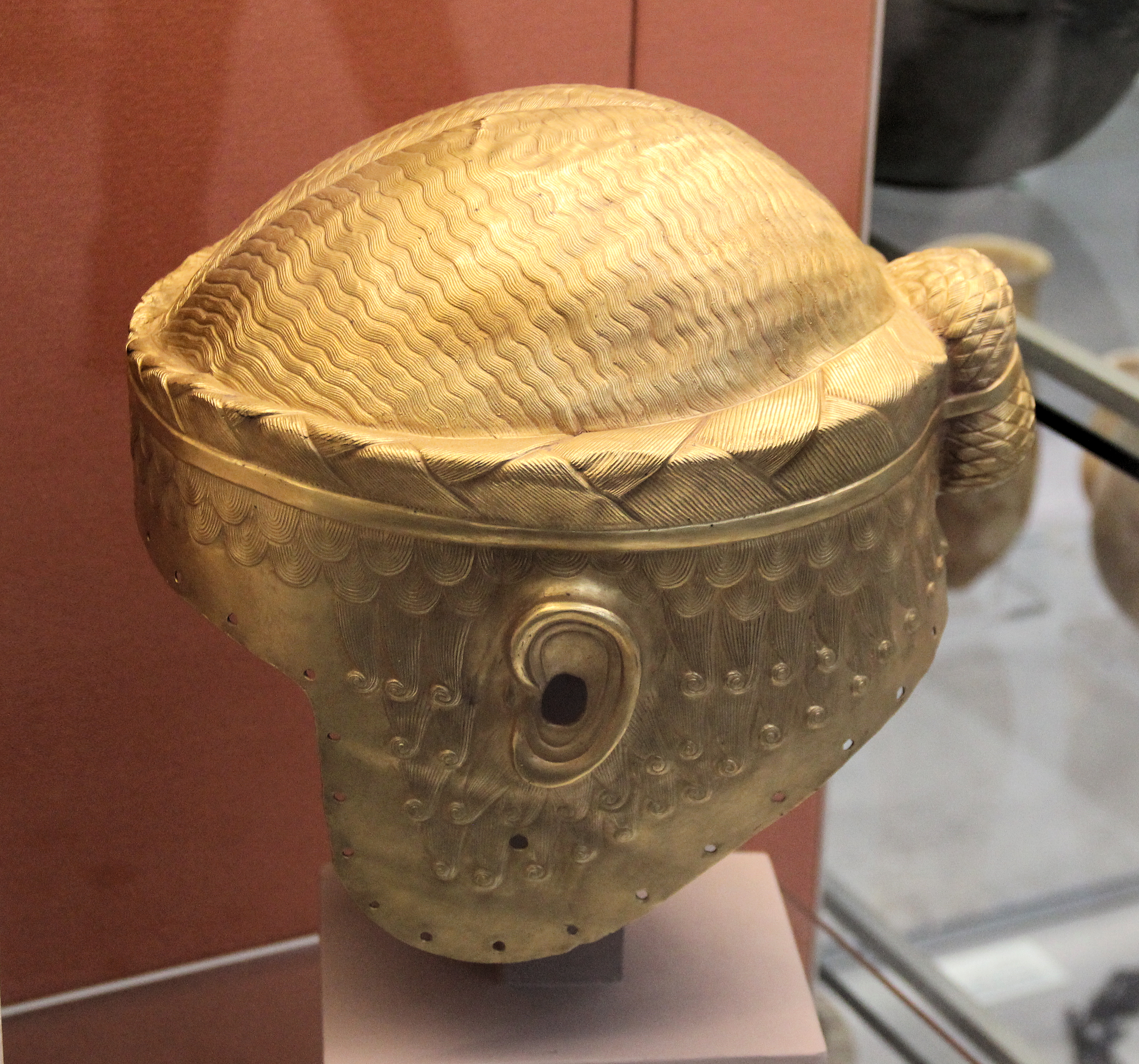
Golden helmet of Meskalamdug, possible founder of the First Dynasty of Ur, 26th century BC

The dynastic period begins c. 2900 BC and was associated with a shift from the temple establishment headed by council of elders led by a priestly "En" (a male figure when it was a temple for a goddess, or a female figure when headed by a male god) towards a more secular Lugal (Lu = man, Gal = great) and includes such legendary patriarchal figures as Dumuzid, Lugalbanda and Gilgamesh—who reigned shortly before the historic record opens c. 2900 BC, when the now deciphered syllabic writing started to develop from the early pictograms. The center of Sumerian culture remained in southern Mesopotamia, even though rulers soon began expanding into neighboring areas, and neighboring Semitic groups adopted much of Sumerian culture for their own.

The earliest dynastic king on the Sumerian king list whose name is known from any other legendary source is Etana, 13th king of the first dynasty of Kish. The earliest king authenticated through archaeological evidence is Enmebaragesi of Kish (Early Dynastic I), whose name is mentioned in the Epic of Gilgamesh—leading to the suggestion that Gilgamesh himself might have been a historical king of Uruk. As the Epic of Gilgamesh shows, this period was associated with increased war. Cities became walled, and increased in size as undefended villages in southern Mesopotamia disappeared. Both Gilgamesh and one of his predecessors Enmerkar are credited with having built the walls of Uruk.

==== 1st Dynasty of Lagash ====
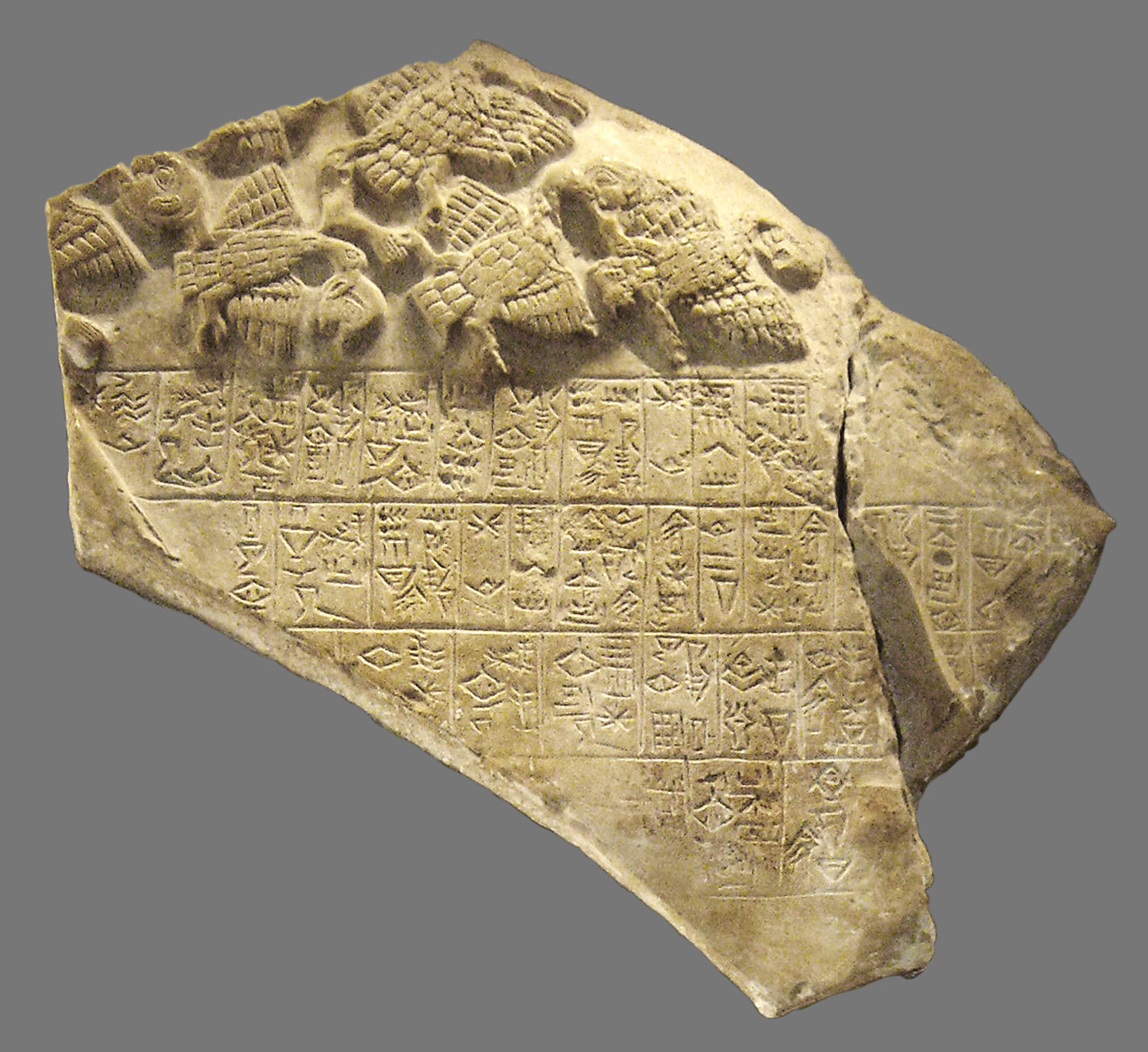
A fragment of Eannatum's Stele of the Vultures

The dynasty of Lagash (c. 2500–2270 BC), though omitted from the king list, is well attested through several important monuments and many archaeological finds.

Although short-lived, one of the first empires known to history was that of Eannatum of Lagash, who annexed practically all of Sumer, including Kish, Uruk, Ur, and Larsa, and reduced to tribute the city-state of Umma, arch-rival of Lagash. In addition, his realm extended to parts of Elam and along the Persian Gulf. He seems to have used terror as a matter of policy. Eannatum's Stele of the Vultures depicts vultures pecking at the severed heads and other body parts of his enemies. His empire collapsed shortly after his death.

Later, Lugal-zage-si, the priest-king of Umma, overthrew the primacy of the Lagash dynasty in the area, then conquered Uruk, making it his capital, and claimed an empire extending from the Persian Gulf to the Mediterranean. He was the last ethnically Sumerian king before Sargon of Akkad.

=== Akkadian Empire ===
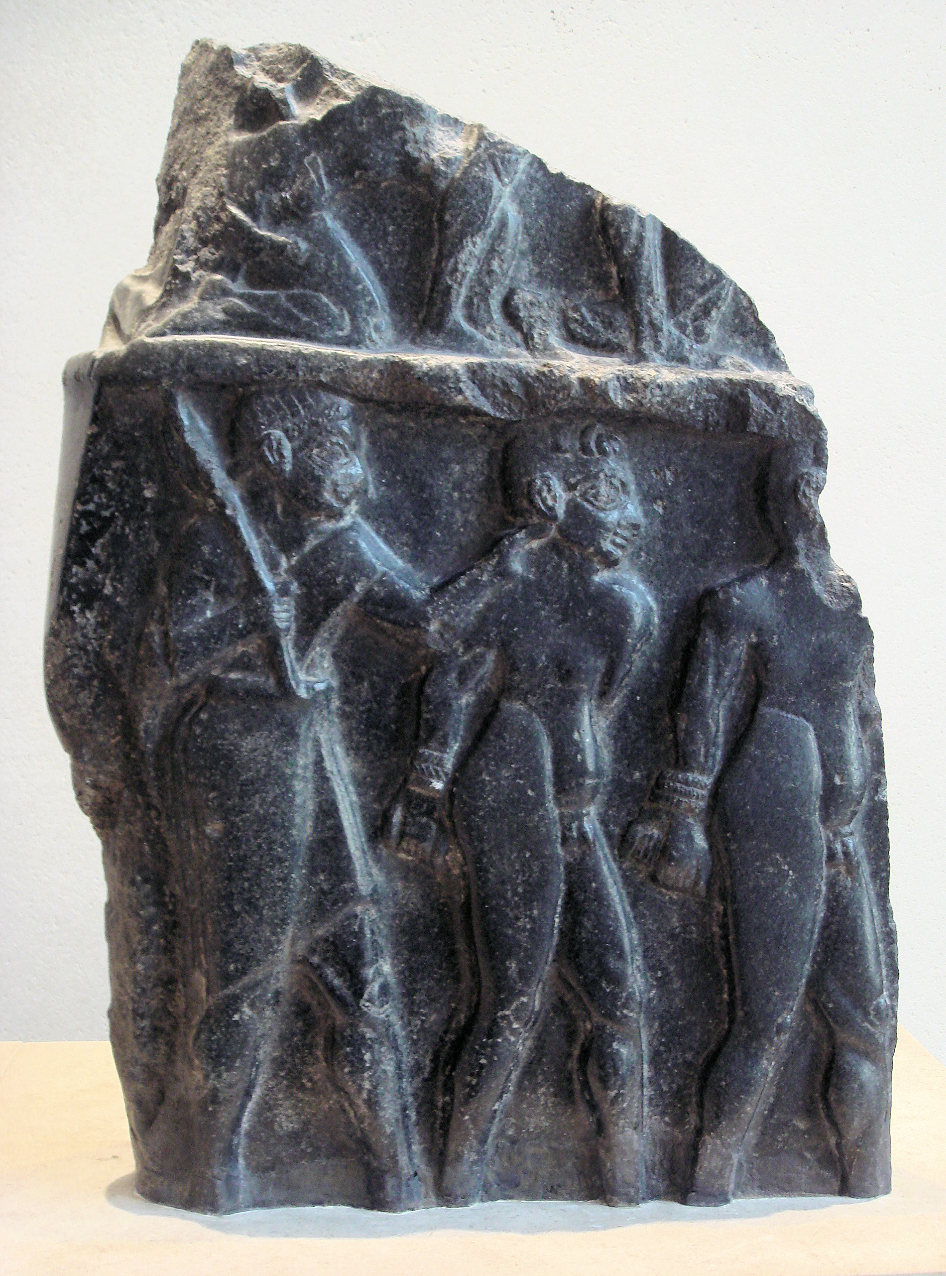
Sumerian prisoners on a victory stele of the Akkadian king Sargon, c. 2300 BC. Louvre Museum.

The Akkadian Empire dates to c. 2334–2154 BC (middle chronology), founded by Sargon of Akkad. The Eastern Semitic Akkadian language is first attested in proper names of the kings of Kish c. 2800 BC, preserved in later king lists. There are texts written entirely in Old Akkadian dating from c. 2500 BC. Use of Old Akkadian was at its peak during the rule of Sargon of Akkad (c. 2334–2279 BC), but even then most administrative tablets continued to be written in Sumerian, the language used by the scribes. Gelb and Westenholz differentiate three stages of Old Akkadian: that of the pre-Sargonic era, that of the Akkadian empire, and that of the Ur III period that followed it.

Akkadian and Sumerian coexisted as vernacular languages for about one thousand years, but by around 1800 BC, Sumerian was becoming more of a literary language familiar mainly only to scholars and scribes. Thorkild Jacobsen has argued that there is little break in historical continuity between the pre- and post-Sargon periods, and that too much emphasis has been placed on the perception of a "Semitic vs. Sumerian" conflict. It is certain that Akkadian was also briefly imposed on neighboring parts of Elam that were previously conquered, by Sargon.

=== Gutian period ===
c. 2193 – c. 2119 BC (middle chronology)

The Gutian people were a group of semi nomadic peoples who originated from the Zagros Mountains of northeastern Mesopotamia. The Gutian Dynasty rose to prominence during the decline and fall of Akkadian Empire under poorly understood circumstances. Following the death of Akkad's last powerful ruler, Shar-Kali-Sharri (c. 2218 – c. 2193 BC), the Gutians gradually took control of Akkadian centers, including the capital Akkad in 2193 BC. The eventual fall of the Akkadian Empire in 2154 BC marked the peak of Gutian strength. There is very little information on the Gutian rulers and people, it is often considered to be a dark age of the Sumerians, an intermediary between the Akkadian Empire and the Third Dynasty of Ur. The Gutian period came to an end with the rise of Utu-hengal of Uruk (c. 2119 – c. 2112 BC), who defeated the last Gutian king, Tirigan, briefly establishing the short lived 5th dynasty of Uruk. Shortly after, Ur-Nammu of Ur (c. 2112 - 2094 BC) would overthrow Utu-hengal's kingdom and establish the Third Dynasty of Ur in 2112 BC.

==== 2nd Dynasty of Lagash ====
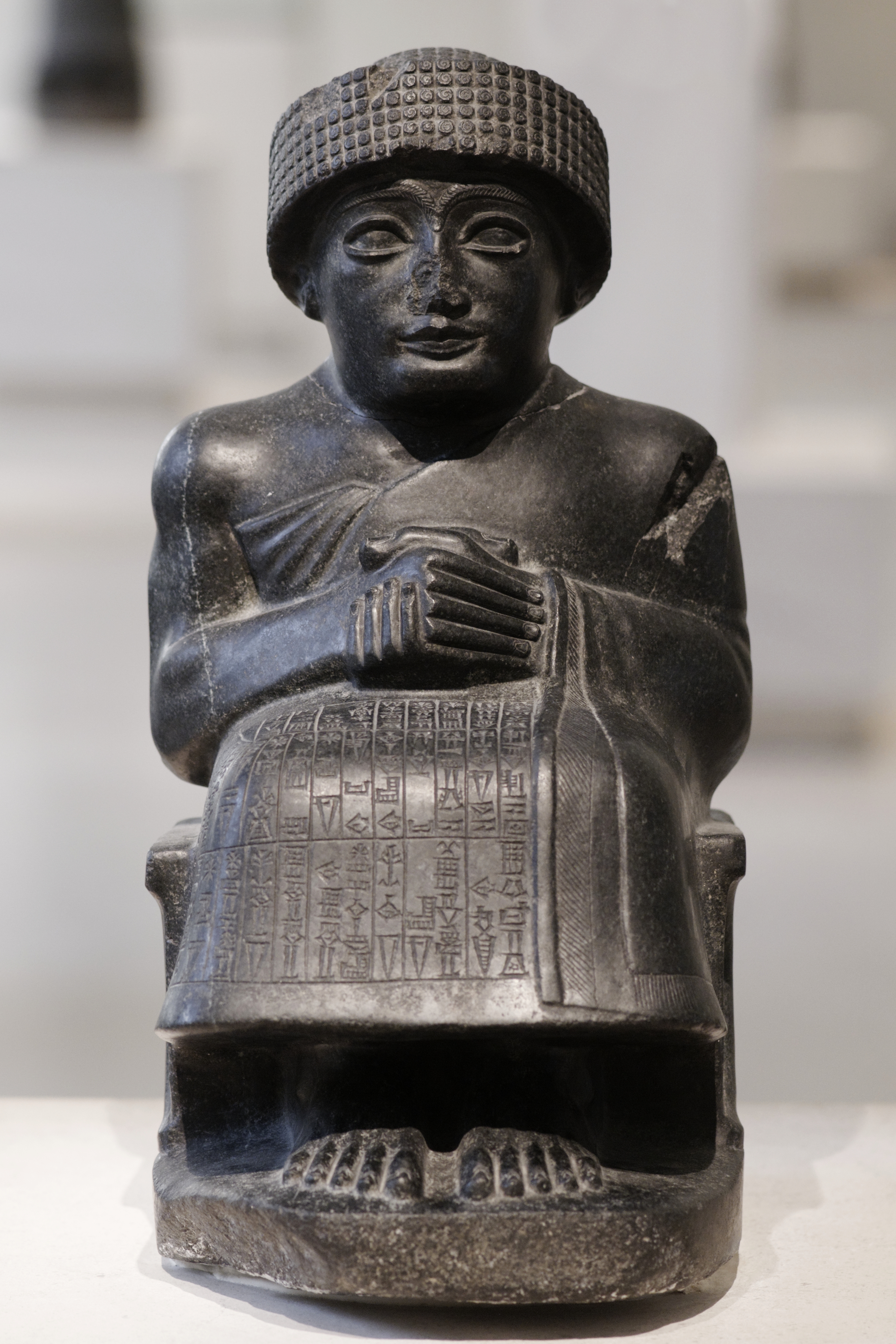
Gudea of Lagash, the Sumerian ruler who was famous for his numerous portrait sculptures that have been recovered.

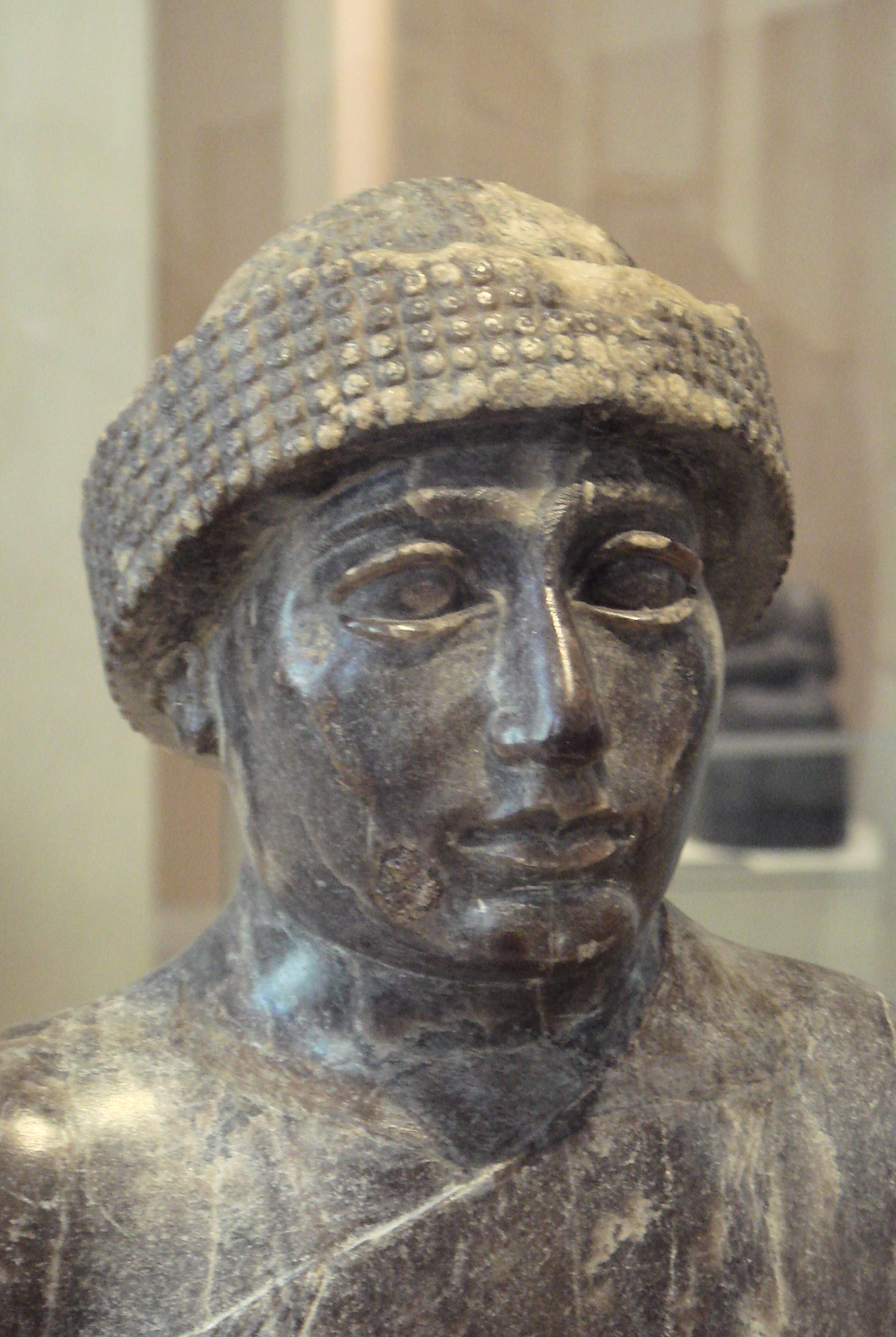
A portrait of Ur-Ningirsu, son of Gudea, c. 2100 BC. Louvre Museum.

c. 2200–2110 BC (middle chronology)

Following the downfall of the Akkadian Empire at the hands of Gutians, another native Sumerian ruler, Gudea of Lagash, rose to local prominence and continued the practices of the Sargonic kings' claims to divinity.

The previous Lagash dynasty, Gudea and his descendants also promoted artistic development and left a large number of archaeological artifacts.

=== Ur III period ===
Later, the Third Dynasty of Ur under Ur-Nammu and Shulgi (c. 2112 – c. 2004 BC, middle chronology), whose power extended as far as southern Assyria, has been erroneously called a "Sumerian renaissance" in the past. Already, the region was becoming more Semitic than Sumerian, with the resurgence of the Akkadian-speaking Semites in Assyria and elsewhere, and the influx of waves of Semitic Martu (Amorites), who founded several competing local powers in the south, including Isin, Larsa, Eshnunna and later, Babylonia.

The last of these eventually came to briefly dominate the south of Mesopotamia as the Babylonian Empire, just as the Old Assyrian Empire had already done in the north from the late 21st century BC. The Sumerian language continued as a sacerdotal language taught in schools in Babylonia and Assyria, much as Latin was used in the Medieval period, for as long as cuneiform was used.

=== Fall and transmission ===
This period is generally taken to coincide with a major shift in population from southern Mesopotamia toward the north. Ecologically, the agricultural productivity of the Sumerian lands was being compromised as a result of rising salinity. Soil salinity in this region had been long recognized as a major problem. Poorly drained irrigated soils, in an arid climate with high levels of evaporation, led to the buildup of dissolved salts in the soil, eventually reducing agricultural yields severely.

During the Akkadian and Ur III phases, there was a shift from the cultivation of wheat to the more salt-tolerant barley, but this was insufficient, and during the period from 2100 BC to 1700 BC, it is estimated that the population in this area declined by nearly three-fifths. This greatly upset the balance of power within the region, weakening the areas where Sumerian was spoken, and comparatively strengthening those where Akkadian was the major language. Henceforth, Sumerian remained only a literary and liturgical language, similar to the position occupied by Latin in medieval Europe.

Following an Elamite invasion and sack of Ur during the rule of Ibbi-Sin (c. 2028 – c. 2004 BC), Sumer came under Amorite rule (taken to introduce the Middle Bronze Age). The independent Amorite states of the 20th to 18th centuries are summarized as the "Dynasty of Isin" in the Sumerian king list, ending with the rise of Babylonia under Hammurabi c. 1800 BC.

Later rulers who dominated Assyria and Babylonia occasionally assumed the old Sargonic title "King of Sumer and Akkad", such as Tukulti-Ninurta I of Assyria after c. 1225 BC.

== Population ==
Uruk, one of Sumer's largest cities, has been estimated to have had a population of 50,000–80,000 at its height. Given the other cities in Sumer, and the large agricultural population, a rough estimate for Sumer's population might be 0.8 million to 1.5 million. The world population at this time has been estimated at 27 million.

The Sumerians spoke a language isolate. A number of linguists have claimed to be able to detect a substrate language of unknown classification beneath Sumerian, because names of some of Sumer's major cities are not Sumerian, revealing influences of earlier inhabitants. However, the archaeological record shows clear uninterrupted cultural continuity from the time of the early Ubaid period (5300–4700 BC, C-14) settlements in southern Mesopotamia. The Sumerian people who settled here, farmed the lands in this region that were made fertile by silt deposited by the Tigris and the Euphrates.

Some archaeologists have speculated that the original speakers of ancient Sumerian may have been farmers, who moved down from the north of Mesopotamia after perfecting irrigation agriculture there. The Ubaid period pottery of southern Mesopotamia has been connected via Choga Mami transitional ware, to the pottery of the Samarra period culture (c. 5700 – c. 4900 BC, C-14) in the north, who were the first to practice a primitive form of irrigation agriculture along the middle Tigris River and its tributaries. The connection is most clearly seen at Tell el-'Oueili near Larsa, excavated by the French in the 1980s, where eight levels yielded pre-Ubaid pottery resembling Samarran ware. According to this theory, farming peoples spread down into southern Mesopotamia because they had developed a temple-centered social organization for mobilizing labor and technology for water control, enabling them to survive and prosper in a difficult environment.

Others have suggested a continuity of Sumerians, from the indigenous hunter-fisherfolk traditions, associated with the bifacial assemblages found on the Arabian littoral. Juris Zarins believes the Sumerians may have been the people living in the Persian Gulf region before it flooded at the end of the last Ice Age.

=== Genetics ===
The closest modern-day people to the Sumerians genetically are considered to be the Marsh Arabs, who shared haplotypes with Iraqi and Assyrian samples, suggesting a common local background.

== Culture ==
=== Social and family life ===
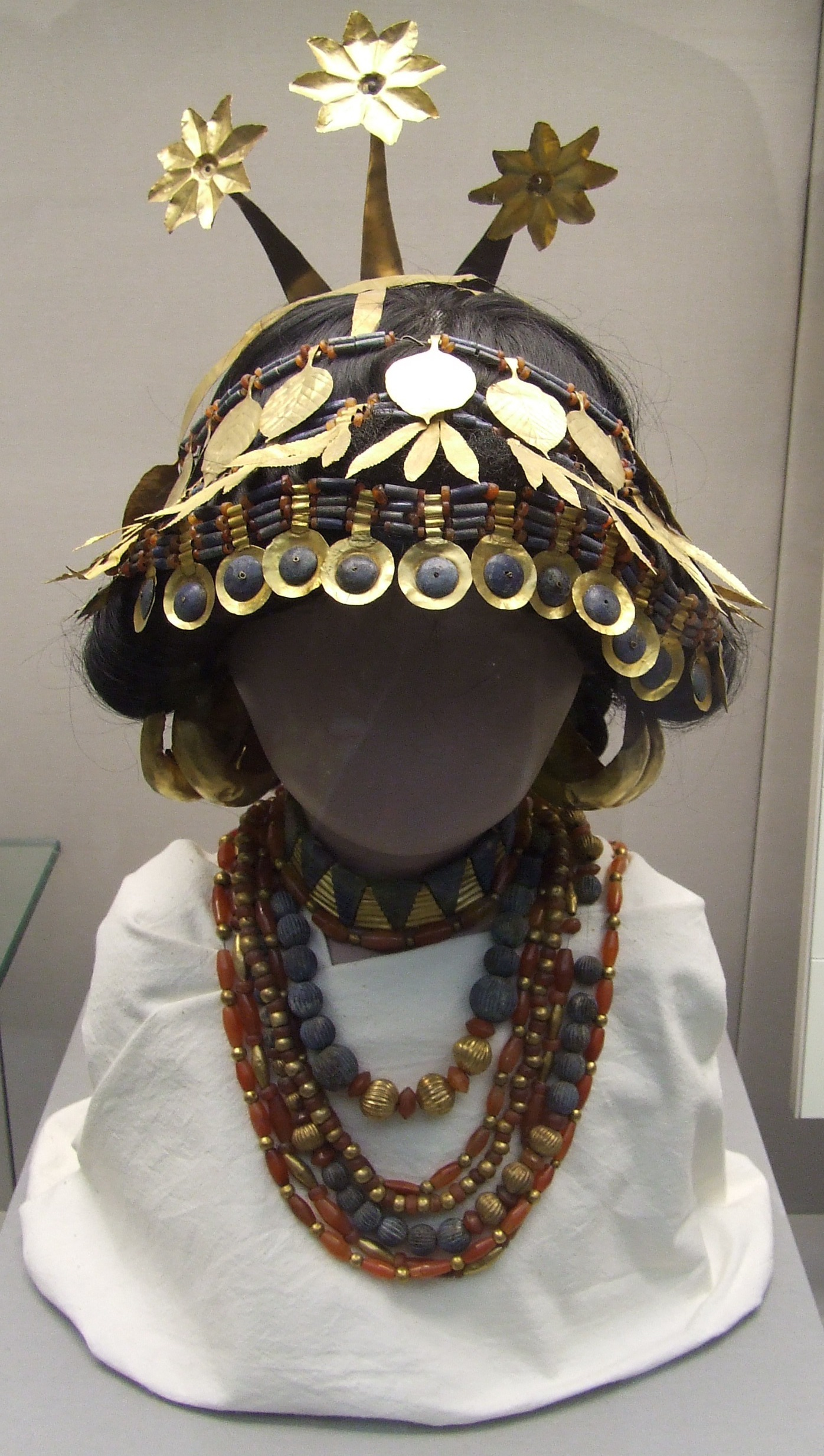
A reconstruction in the British Museum of headgear and necklaces worn by the women at the Royal Cemetery at Ur.

In the early Sumerian period, the primitive pictograms suggest that

- "Pottery was very plentiful, and the forms of the vases, bowls and dishes were manifold; there were special jars for honey, butter, oil and wine, which was probably made from dates. Some of the vases had pointed feet, and stood on stands with crossed legs; others were flat-bottomed, and were set on square or rectangular frames of wood. The oil-jars, and probably others also, were sealed with clay, precisely as in early Egypt. Vases and dishes of stone were made in imitation of those of clay."
- "A feathered head-dress was worn. Beds, stools and chairs were used, with carved legs resembling those of an ox. There were fire-places and fire-altars."
- "Knives, drills, wedges and an instrument that looks like a saw were all known. While spears, bows, arrows, and daggers (but not swords) were employed in war."
- "Tablets were used for writing purposes. Daggers with metal blades and wooden handles were worn, and copper was hammered into plates, while necklaces or collars were made of gold."
- "Time was reckoned in lunar months."

There is considerable evidence concerning Sumerian music. Lyres and flutes were played, among the best-known examples being the Lyres of Ur.

Sumerian culture was male-dominated and stratified. The Code of Ur-Nammu, the oldest such codification yet discovered, dating to the Ur III, reveals a glimpse at societal structure in late Sumerian law. Beneath the lu-gal ("great man" or king), all members of society belonged to one of two basic strata: The "lu" or free person, and the slave (male, arad; female geme). The son of a lu was called a dumu-nita until he married. A woman (munus) went from being a daughter (dumu-mi), to a wife (dam), then if she outlived her husband, a widow (numasu) and she could then remarry another man who was from the same tribe.

In early Sumer women played an important public rule as priestesses. They could also own property, transact business and had their rights protected by the courts. Sons and daughters inherited property on equal terms. The status of women deteriorated in the centuries after 2300 BC. Their right to dispose of their property was limited, and the female deities also lost their former importance.

Inscriptions describing the reforms of king Urukagina of Lagash (c. 2350 BC) say that he abolished the former custom of polyandry in his country, prescribing that a woman who took multiple husbands be stoned with rocks upon which her crime had been written.

Sumerian princess (c. 2150 BC)

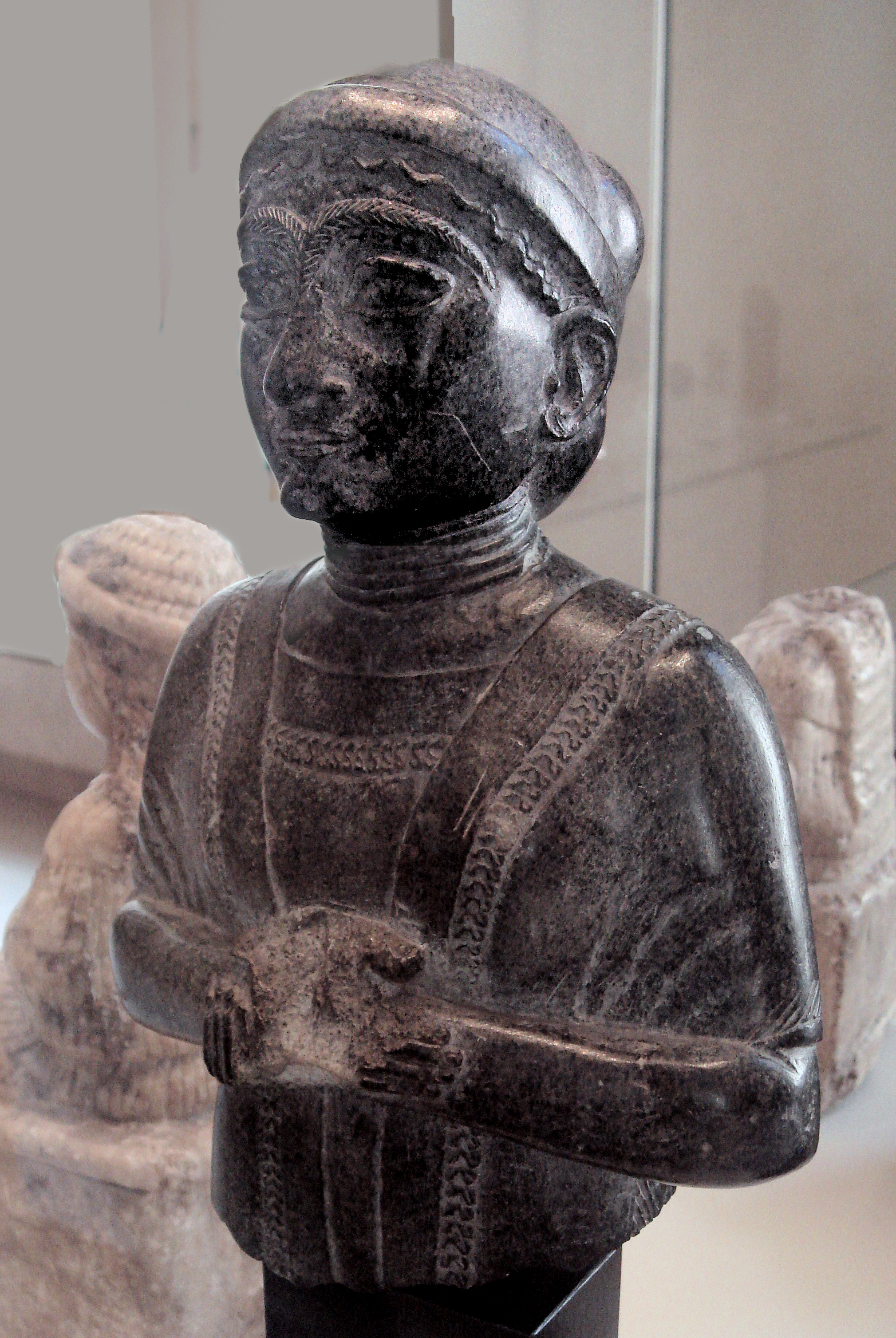
A Sumerian princess of the time of Gudea c. 2150 BC.

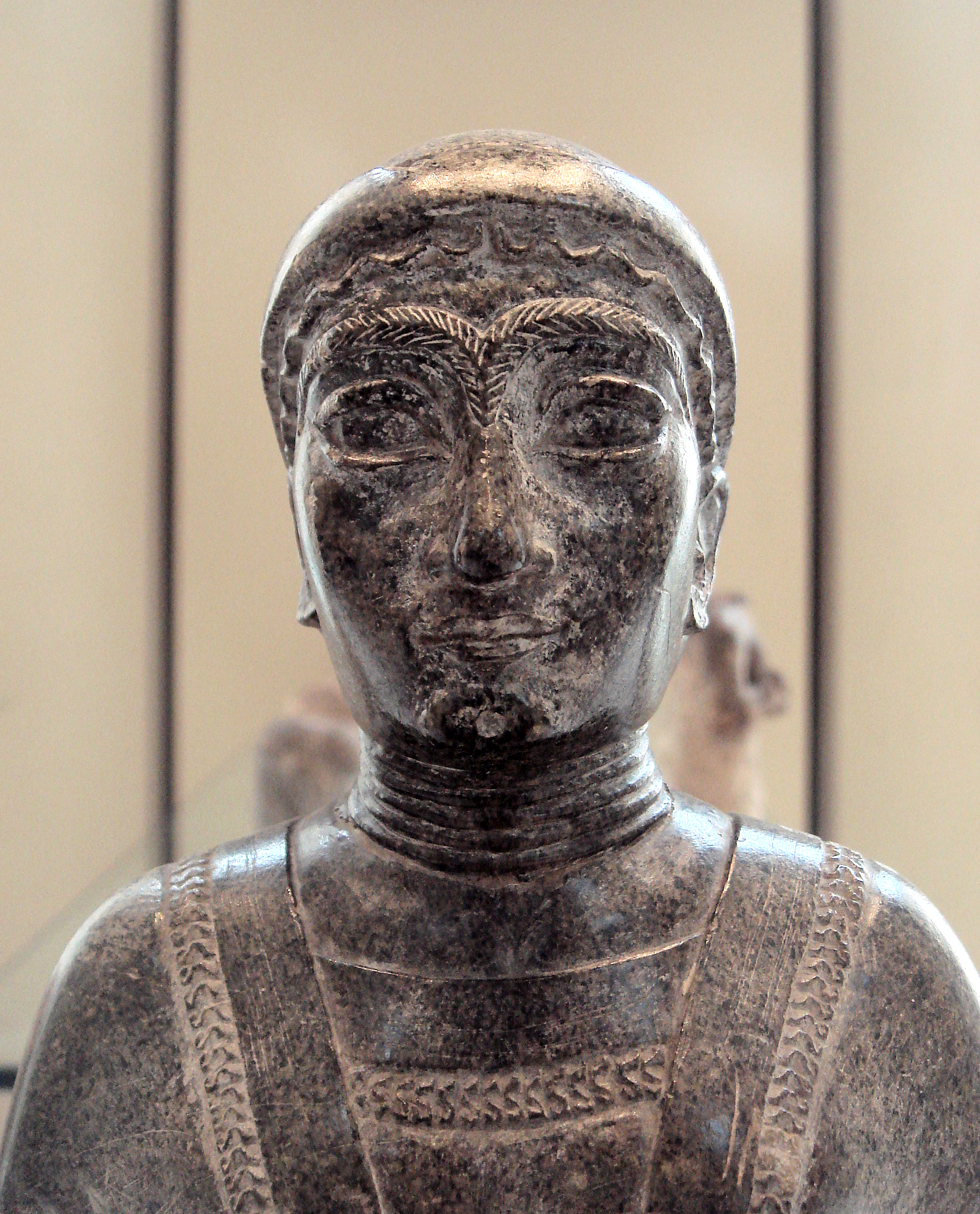
Frontal detail.
Louvre Museum AO 295.

Marriages were usually arranged by the parents of the bride and groom; engagements were usually completed through the approval of contracts recorded on clay tablets. These marriages became legal as soon as the groom delivered a bridal gift to his bride's father. One Sumerian proverb describes the ideal, happy marriage, through the mouth of a husband, who boasts that his wife has borne him eight sons and is still eager to have sex.

The Sumerians considered it desirable for women to still be virgins at the time of marriage, but did not expect the same of men, although one author considers premarital sex in general to have been discouraged. Neither Sumerian nor Akkadian had a word exactly corresponding to the English word 'virginity', and the concept was expressed descriptively, for example as a/é-nu-gi_{4}-a (Sum.)/la naqbat (Akk.) 'un-deflowered', or giš nunzua, 'never having known a penis'. It is unclear whether terms such as šišitu in Akkadian medical texts indicate the hymen, but it appears that the intactness of the hymen was much less relevant to assessing a woman's virginity than in later cultures of the Near East. Most assessments of virginity depended on the woman's own account.

From the earliest records, the Sumerians had very relaxed attitudes toward sex. Their sexual mores were determined not by whether a sexual act was deemed immoral, but rather by whether or not it made a person ritually unclean. The Sumerians widely believed that masturbation enhanced sexual potency, both for men and for women, and they frequently engaged in it, both alone and with their partners. The Sumerians did not regard anal sex as taboo either. Entu priestesses were forbidden from producing offspring and frequently engaged in anal sex as a method of birth control.

Prostitution existed, but it is not clear if sacred prostitution did.

=== Language and writing ===
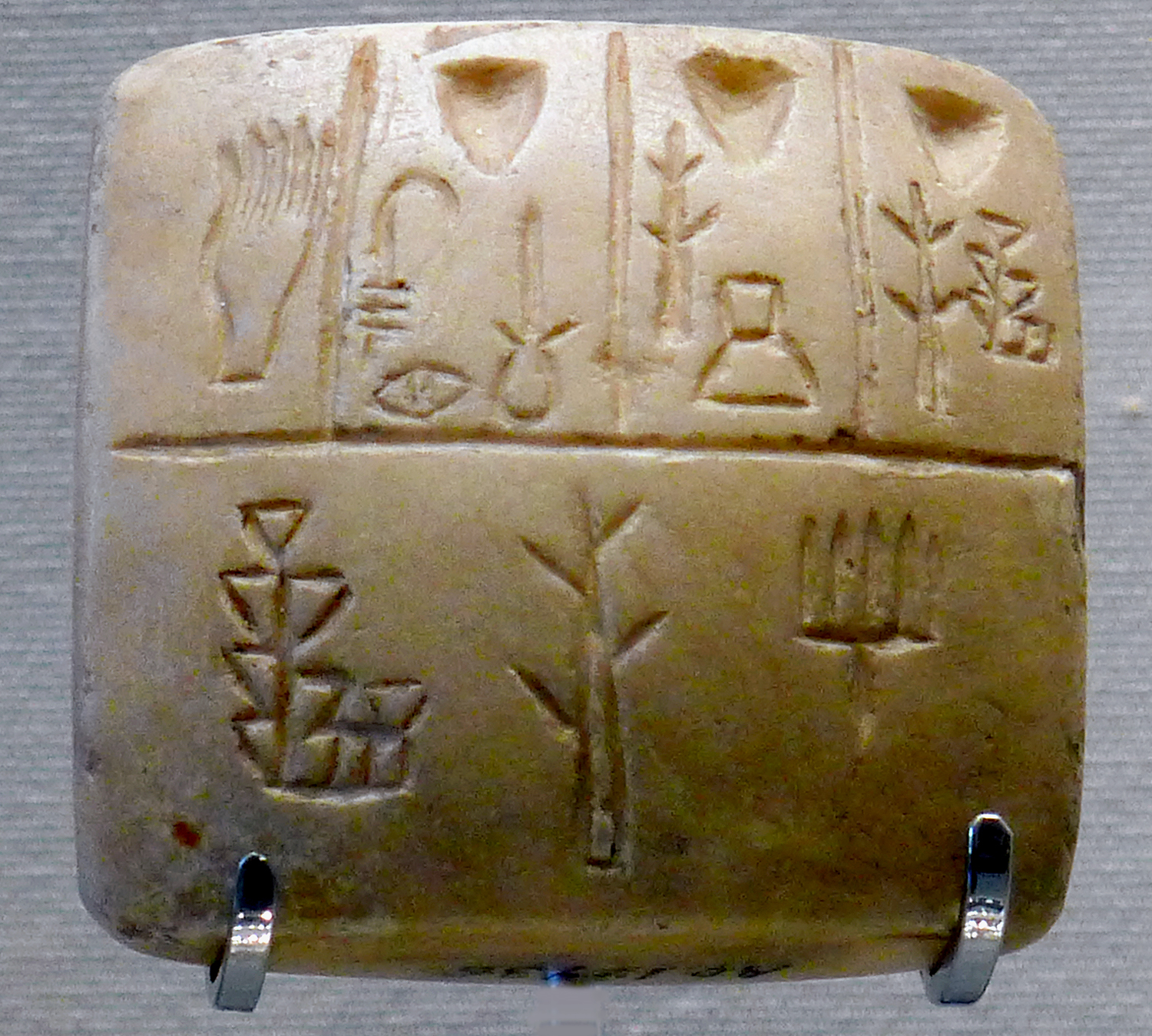
A tablet with pictographic pre-cuneiform writing. Late 4th millennium BC, limestone. Height: 4.5 cm, width: 4.3 cm, depth: 2.4 cm. The Louvre

The most important archaeological discoveries in Sumer are a large number of clay tablets written in cuneiform script. Sumerian writing is considered to be a great milestone in the development of humanity's ability to not only create historical records but also in creating pieces of literature, both in the form of poetic epics and stories as well as prayers and laws.

Although the writing system was first hieroglyphic using ideograms, logosyllabic cuneiform soon followed.

Triangular or wedge-shaped reeds were used to write on moist clay. A large body of hundreds of thousands of texts in the Sumerian language have survived, including personal and business letters, receipts, lexical lists, laws, hymns, prayers, stories, and daily records. Full libraries of clay tablets have been found. Monumental inscriptions and texts on different objects, like statues or bricks, are also very common. Many texts survive in multiple copies because they were repeatedly transcribed by scribes in training. Sumerian continued to be the language of religion and law in Mesopotamia long after Semitic speakers had become dominant.

A prime example of cuneiform writing is a lengthy poem that was discovered in the ruins of Uruk. The Epic of Gilgamesh was written in the standard Sumerian cuneiform. It tells of a king from the early Dynastic II period named Gilgamesh or "Bilgamesh" in Sumerian. The story relates the fictional adventures of Gilgamesh and his companion, Enkidu. It was laid out on several clay tablets and is thought to be the earliest known surviving example of fictional literature.

The Sumerian language is generally regarded as a language isolate in linguistics, because it belongs to no known language family. Akkadian, by contrast, belongs to the Semitic branch of the Afroasiatic languages. There have been many failed attempts to connect Sumerian to other language families. It is an agglutinative language. In other words, morphemes ("units of meaning") are added together to create words, unlike analytic languages where morphemes are purely added together to create sentences. Some authors have proposed that there may be evidence of a substratum or adstratum language for geographic features and various crafts and agricultural activities, called variously Proto-Euphratean or Proto Tigrean, but this is disputed by others.

Understanding Sumerian texts today can be problematic. Most difficult are the earliest texts, which in many cases do not give the full grammatical structure of the language and seem to have been used as an aide-mémoire for knowledgeable scribes.

Akkadian gradually replaced Sumerian as a spoken language somewhere around the turn of the 3rd and the 2nd millennium BC. Sumerian continued to be used as a sacred, ceremonial, literary, and scientific language in Babylonia and Assyria until the 1st century AD.

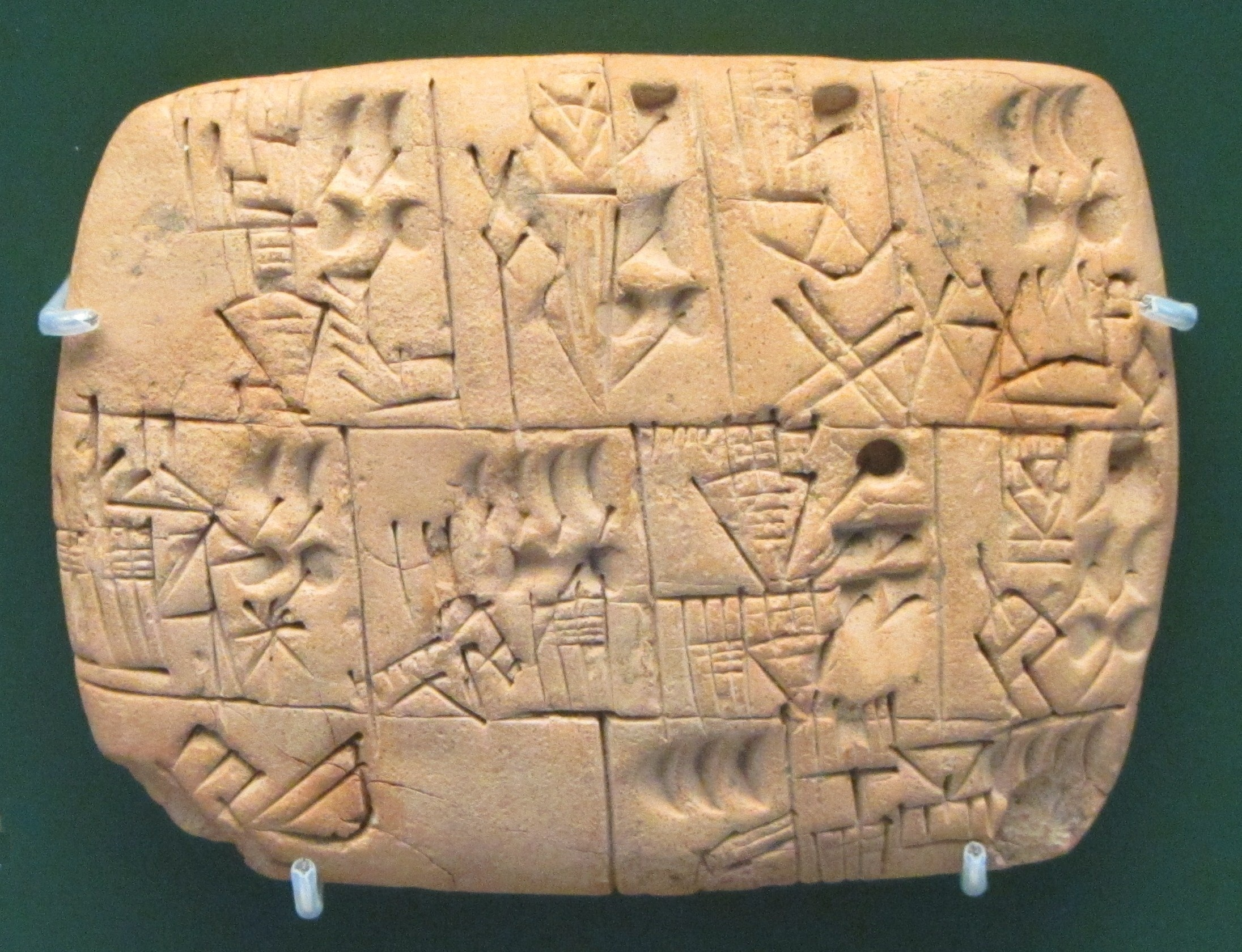
An early writing tablet for recording the allocation of beer, 3100–3000 BC, from Iraq. British Museum, London

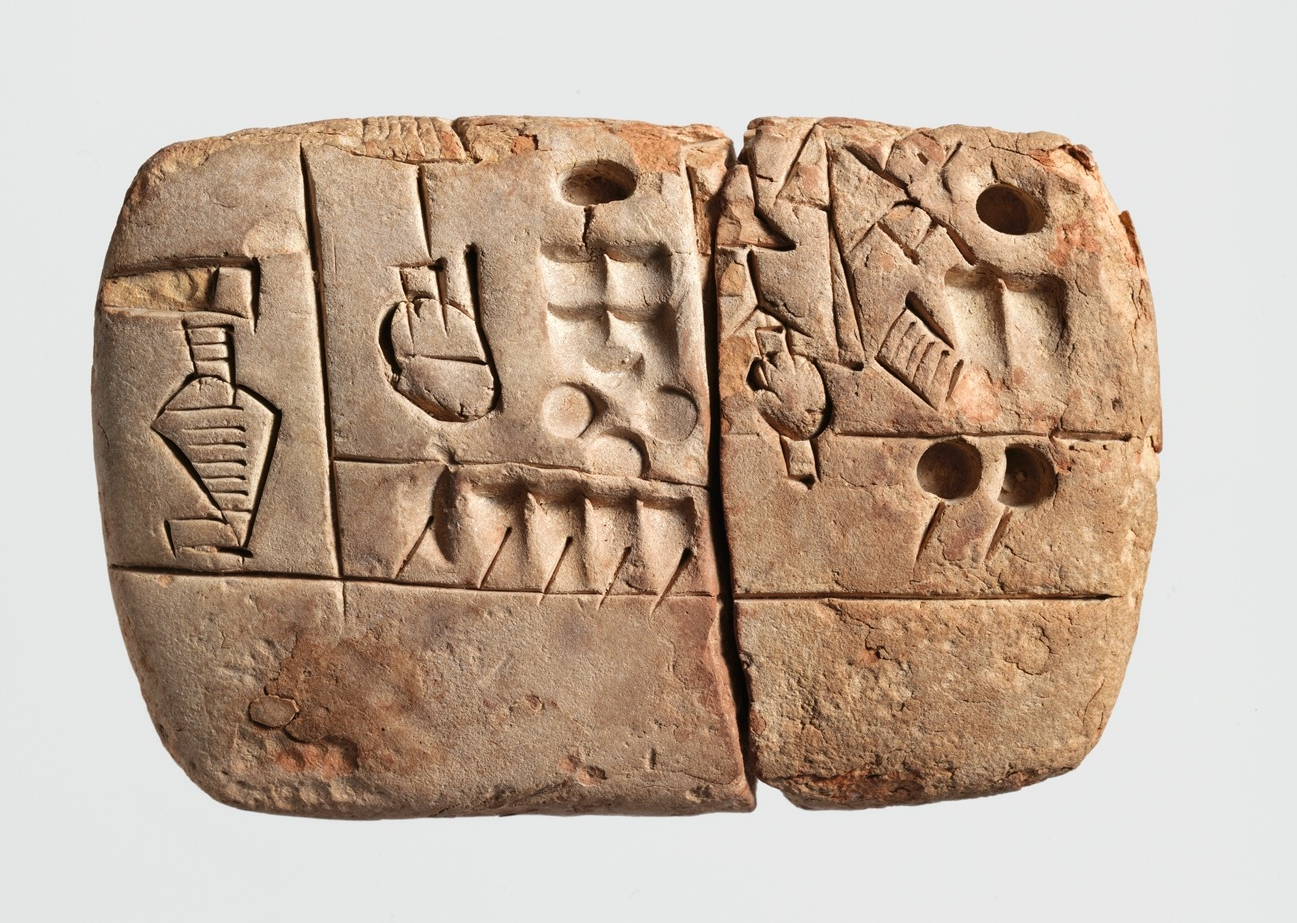
A cuneiform tablet about an administrative account, with entries concerning malt and barley groats, 3100–2900 BC. Clay, 6.8 × 4.5 × 1.6 cm, the Metropolitan Museum of Art, New York City

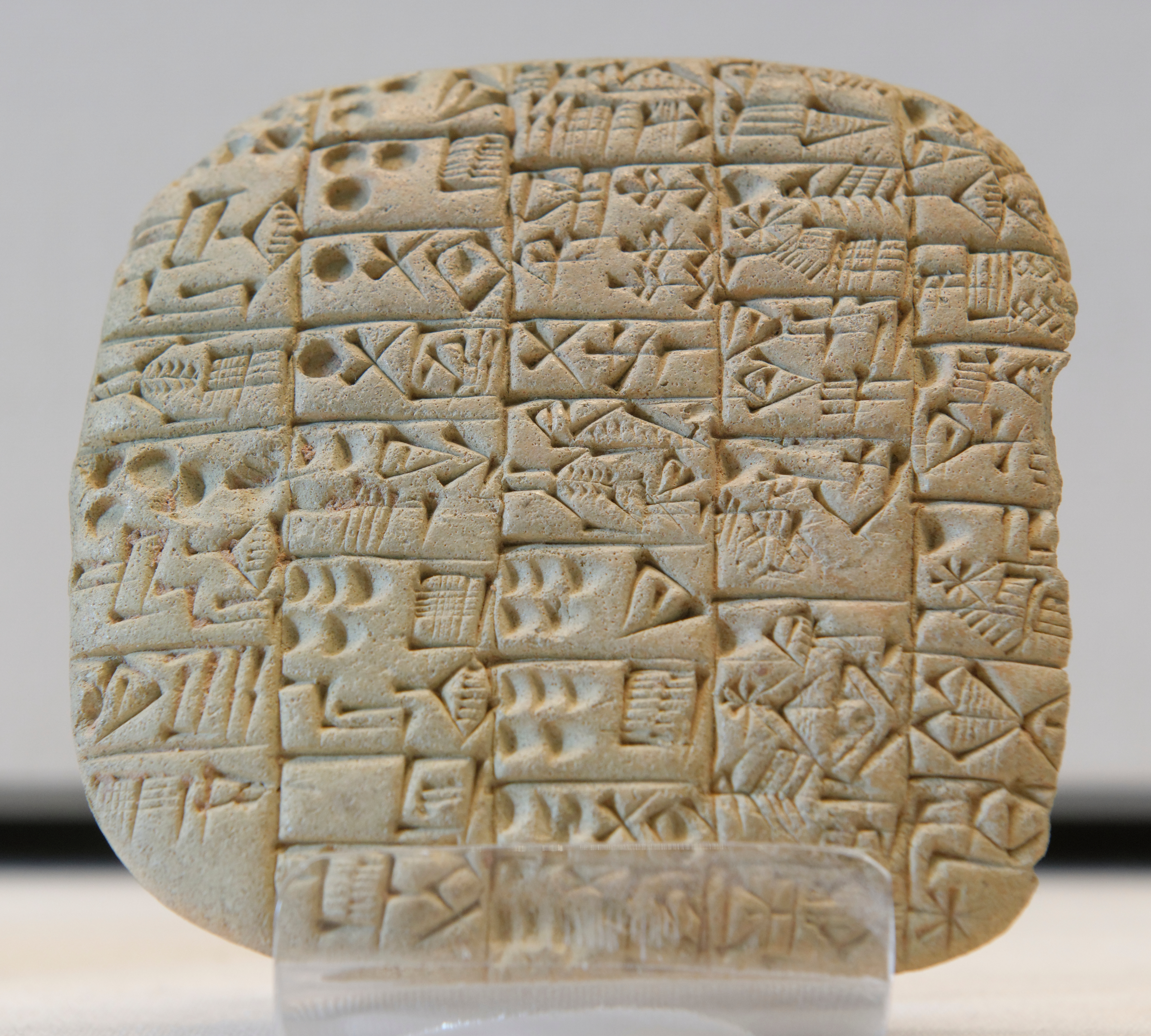
A bill of sale of a field and a house, from Shuruppak, c. 2600 BC. Height: 8.5 cm, width: 8.5 cm, depth: 2 cm. The Louvre

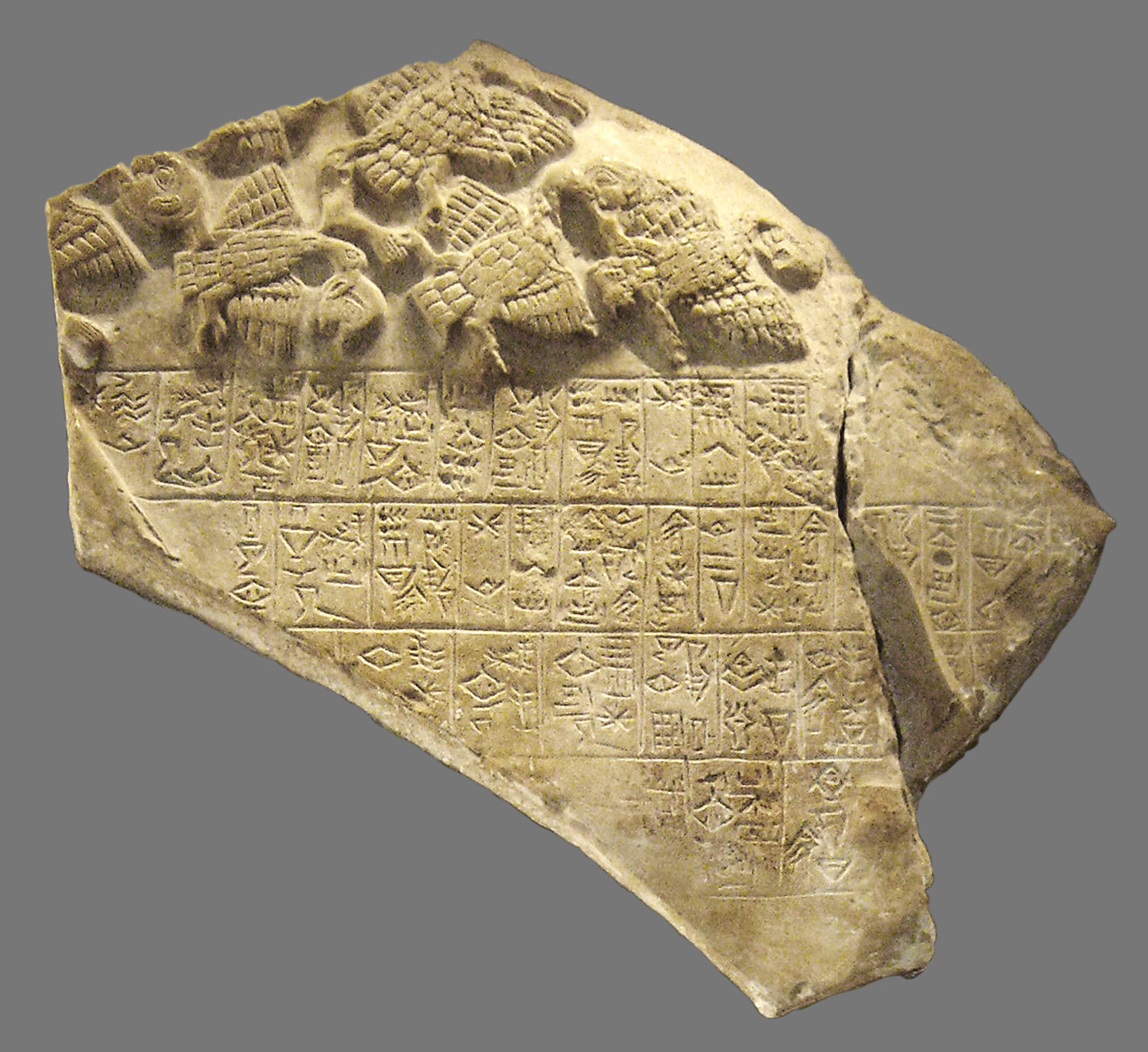
Stele of the Vultures, c. 2450 BC, limestone, Found in 1881 by Édouard de Sarzec in Girsu, now Tell Telloh, Iraq. The Louvre

=== Religion ===
Sumerian religion

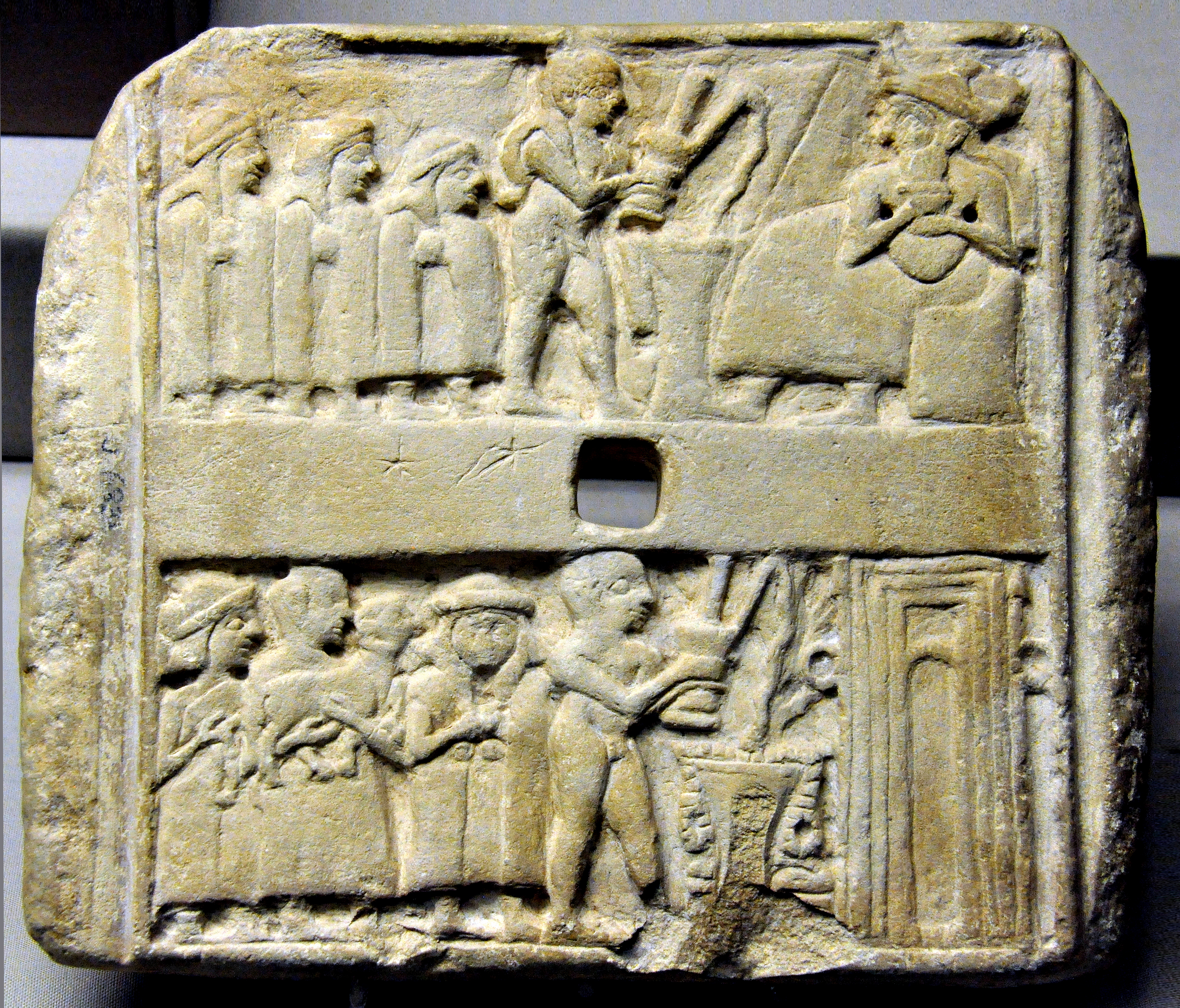
Wall plaque showing libations to a seated god and a temple. Ur, 2500 BC

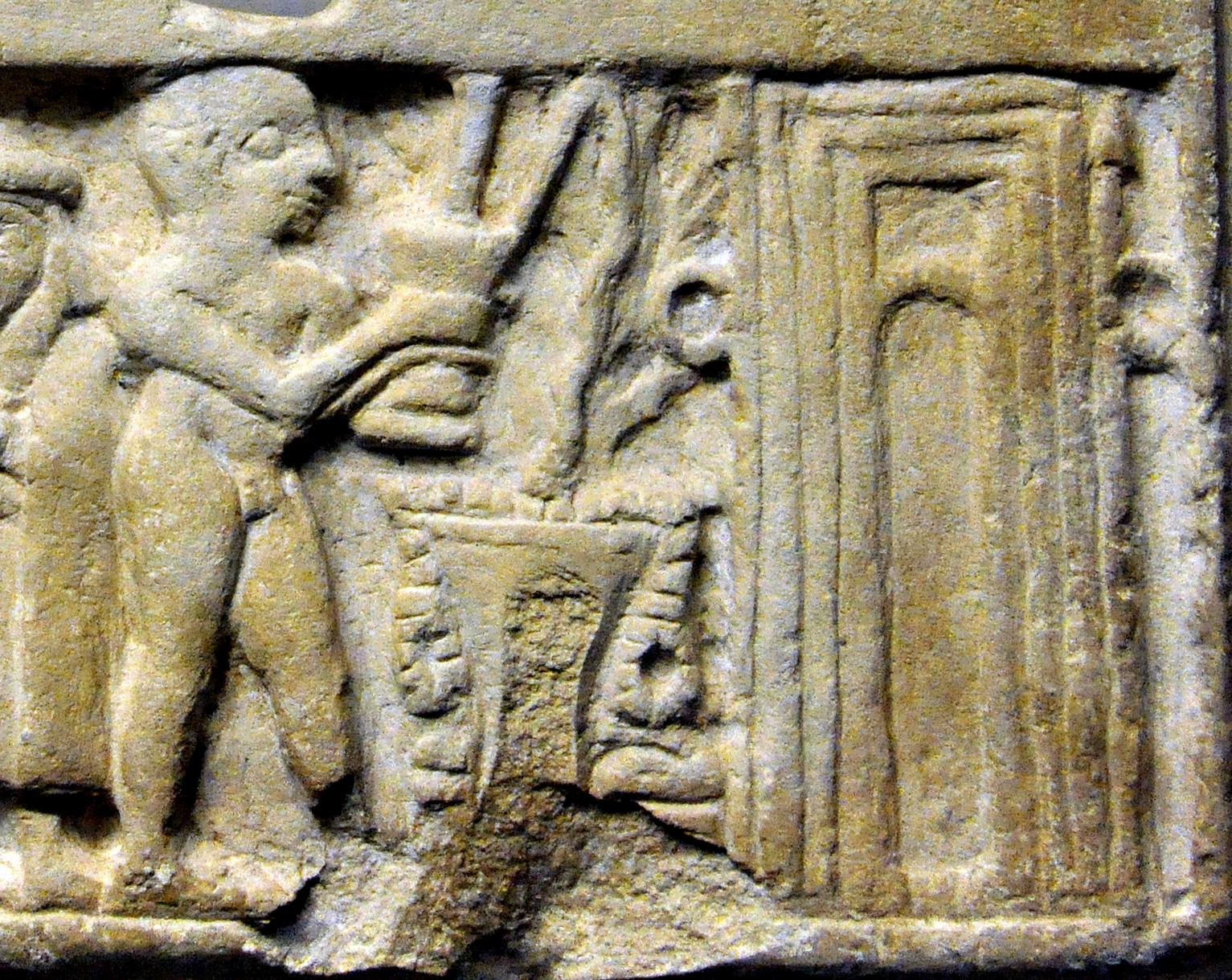
Naked priest offering libations to a Sumerian temple (detail), Ur, 2500 BC

The Sumerians credited their divinities for all matters pertaining to them and exhibited humility in the face of cosmic forces, such as death and divine wrath.

Sumerian religion seems to have been founded upon two separate cosmogenic myths. The first saw creation as the result of a series of hieroi gamoi or sacred marriages, involving the reconciliation of opposites, postulated as a coming together of male and female divine beings, the gods.

This pattern continued to influence regional Mesopotamian myths. Thus, in the later Akkadian Enuma Elish, creation was seen as the union of fresh and salt water, between male Abzu, and female Tiamat. The products of that union, Lahm and Lahmu, "the muddy ones", were titles given to the gate keepers of the E-Abzu temple of Enki in Eridu, the first Sumerian city.

Mirroring the way that muddy islands emerge from the confluence of fresh and salty water at the mouth of the Euphrates, where the river deposits its load of silt, a second hieros gamos supposedly resulted in the creation of Anshar and Kishar, the "sky-pivot" (or axle), and the "earth pivot", parents in turn of Anu (the sky) and Ki (the earth).

Another important Sumerian hieros gamos was that between Ki, here known as Ninhursag or "Lady of the Mountains", and Enki of Eridu, the god of fresh water which brought forth greenery and pasture.

At an early stage, following the dawn of recorded history, Nippur, in central Mesopotamia, replaced Eridu in the south as the primary temple city, whose priests exercised political hegemony on the other city-states. Nippur retained this status throughout the Sumerian period.

==== Deities ====
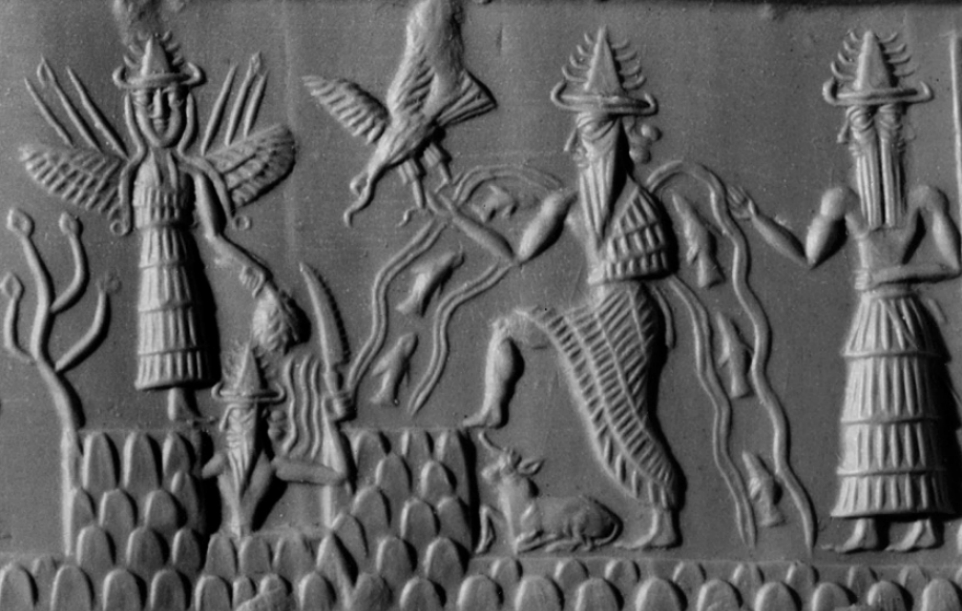
Akkadian cylinder seal from sometime around 2300 BC or thereabouts depicting the deities Inanna, Utu, Enki, and Isimud

Sumerians believed in an anthropomorphic polytheism, or the belief in many gods in human form. There was no common set of gods; each city-state had its own patrons, temples, and priest-kings. Nonetheless, these were not exclusive; the gods of one city were often acknowledged elsewhere. Sumerian speakers were among the earliest people to record their beliefs in writing, and were a major inspiration in later Mesopotamian mythology, religion, and astrology.

The Sumerians worshiped:

- An as the full-time god equivalent to heaven; indeed, the word an in Sumerian means sky and his consort Ki, means earth.
- Enki in the south at the temple in Eridu. Enki was the god of beneficence and of wisdom, ruler of the freshwater depths beneath the earth, a healer and friend to humanity who in Sumerian myth was thought to have given humans the arts and sciences, the industries and manners of civilization; the first law book was considered his creation.
- Enlil was the god of storm, wind, and rain. He was the chief god of the Sumerian pantheon and the patron god of Nippur. His consort was Ninlil, the goddess of the south wind.
- Inanna was the goddess of love, sexuality, and war; the deification of Venus, the morning (eastern) and evening (western) star, at the temple (shared with An) at Uruk. Deified kings may have re-enacted the marriage of Inanna and Dumuzid with priestesses.
- The sun-god Utu at Larsa in the south and Sippar in the north,
- The moon god Sin at Ur.

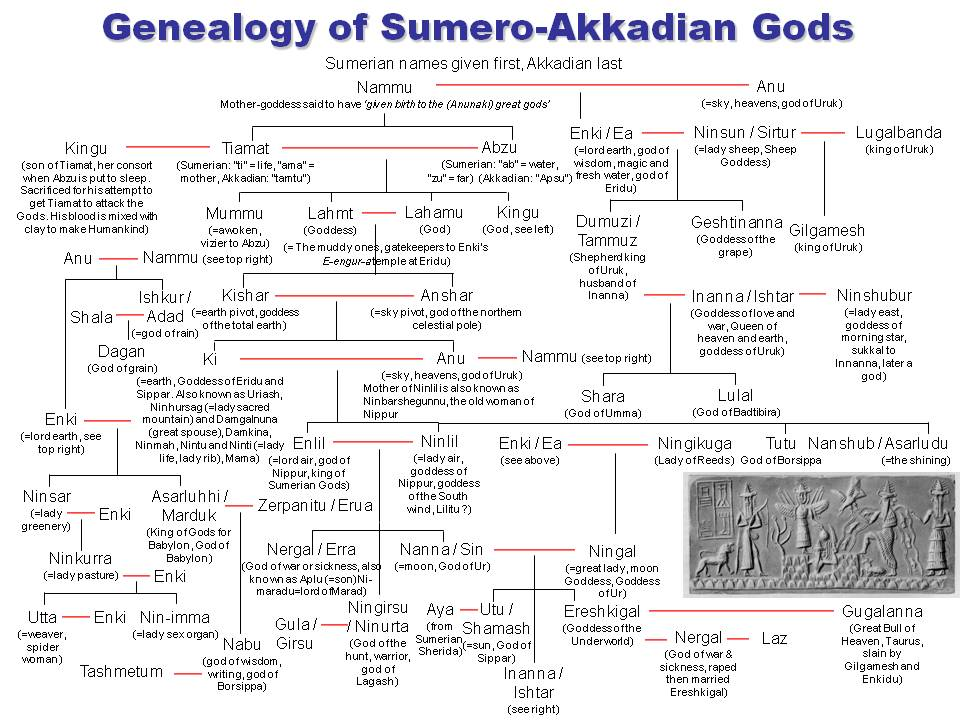
Sumero-early Akkadian pantheon

These deities formed the main pantheon, and in addition to this there were hundreds of other minor gods. Sumerian gods were often associated with different cities, and their religious importance often waxed and waned with those cities' political power. The gods were said to have created human beings from clay for the purpose of serving them. The temples organized the mass labour projects needed for irrigation agriculture. Citizens had a labor duty to the temple, though they could avoid it by a payment of silver.

==== Cosmology ====
Sumerians envisioned Earth to be a rectangular field with four corners. The Sumerian afterlife involved a descent into a gloomy netherworld to spend eternity in a wretched existence as a Gidim (ghost).

The universe was divided into four quarters:

- To the north were the hill-dwelling Subartu, who were periodically raided for slaves, timber, and other raw materials.
- To the west were the tent-dwelling Martu, ancient Semitic-speaking peoples living as pastoral nomads tending herds of sheep and goats.
- To the south was the land of Dilmun, a trading state associated with the land of the dead and the place of creation.
- To the east were the Elamites, a rival people with whom the Sumerians were frequently at war.

Their known world extended from The Upper Sea or Mediterranean coastline, to The Lower Sea, the Persian Gulf and the land of Meluhha (probably the Indus Valley) and Magan (Oman), famed for its copper ores.

==== Temple and temple organisation ====
Ziggurats (Sumerian temples) each had an individual name and contained a forecourt with a central pond for purification. The temple itself had a central nave with aisles along either side. Flanking the aisles were rooms for the priests. At one end stood a podium and a mudbrick table for animal and vegetable sacrifices. Granaries and storehouses were usually located near the temples. After a time the Sumerians began to place the temples on top of multi-layered square constructions built as a series of rising terraces, giving rise to the Ziggurat style.

==== Funerary practices ====
It was believed that when people died, they would be confined to a gloomy world of Ereshkigal, whose realm was guarded by gateways with various monsters designed to prevent people entering or leaving. The dead were buried outside the city walls in graveyards where a small mound covered the corpse, along with offerings to monsters and a small amount of food. Those who could afford it sought burial at Dilmun. Human sacrifice was found in the death pits at the Ur royal cemetery where Queen Puabi was accompanied in death by her servants.

=== Agriculture and hunting ===
The Sumerians adopted an agricultural lifestyle perhaps as early as c. 5000 – c. 4500 BC. The region demonstrated a number of core agricultural techniques, including organized irrigation, large-scale intensive cultivation of land, monocropping involving the use of plough agriculture, and the use of an agricultural specialized labour force under bureaucratic control. The necessity to manage temple accounts with this organization led to the development of writing (c. 3500 BC).

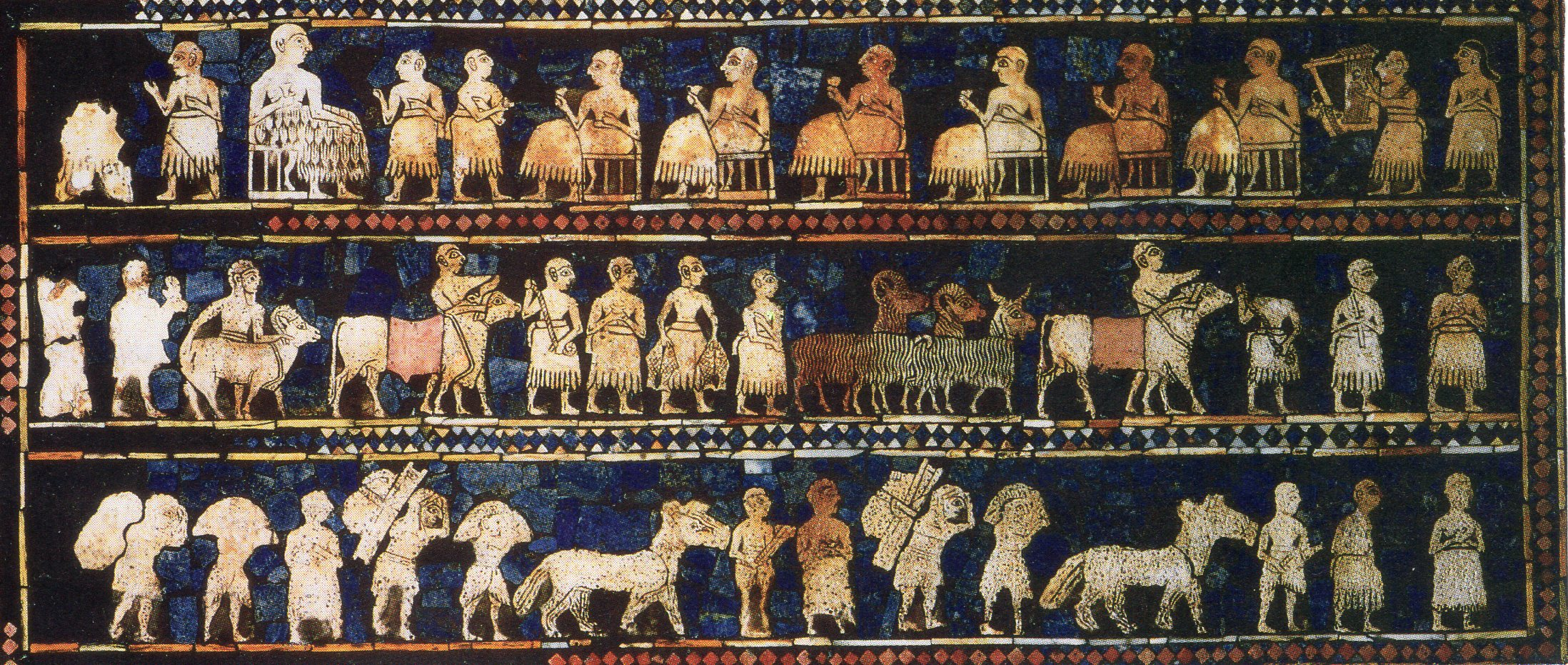
From the royal tombs of Ur, made of lapis lazuli and shell, shows peacetime

In the early Sumerian Uruk period, the primitive pictograms suggest that sheep, goats, cattle, and pigs were domesticated. They used oxen as their primary beasts of burden and donkeys or equids as their primary transport animal and "woollen clothing as well as rugs were made from the wool or hair of the animals. ... By the side of the house was an enclosed garden planted with trees and other plants; wheat and probably other cereals were sown in the fields, and the shaduf was already employed for the purpose of irrigation. Plants were also grown in pots or vases."

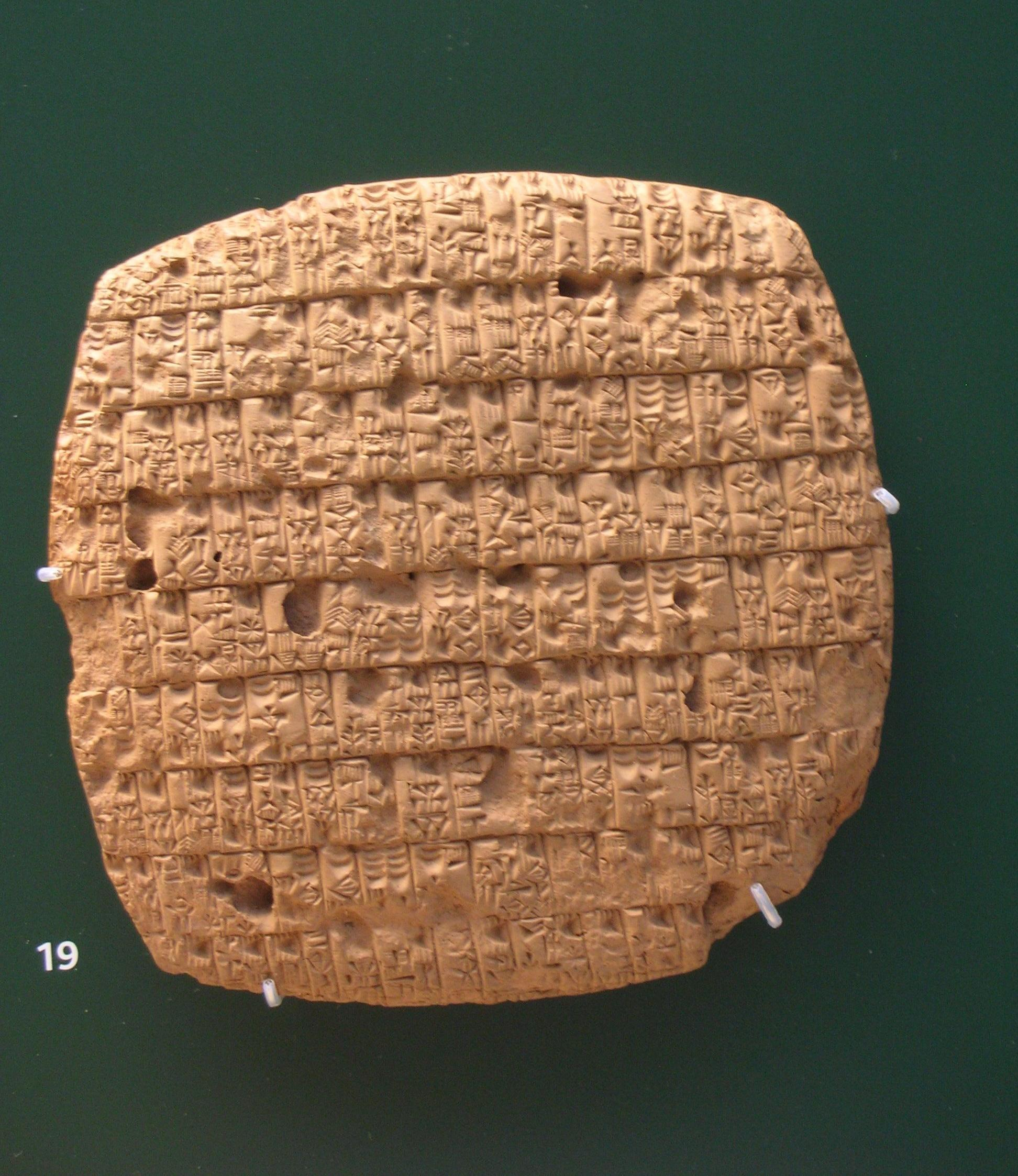
An account of barley rations issued monthly to adults and children written in cuneiform script on a clay tablet, written in year 4 of King Urukagina, c. 2350 BC

The Sumerians were one of the first known beer-drinking societies. Cereals were plentiful and were the key ingredient in their early brew. They brewed multiple kinds of beer consisting of wheat, barley, and mixed grain beers. Beer brewing was very important to the Sumerians. It was referenced in the Epic of Gilgamesh when Enkidu was introduced to the food and beer of Gilgamesh's people: "Drink the beer, as is the custom of the land ... He drank the beer—seven jugs! and became expansive and sang with joy!"

The Sumerians practiced similar irrigation techniques as those used in Egypt. American anthropologist Robert McCormick Adams says that irrigation development was associated with urbanization, and that 89% of the population lived in the cities.

They grew barley, chickpeas, lentils, wheat, dates, onions, garlic, lettuce, leeks and mustard. Sumerians caught many fish and hunted fowl and gazelle.

Sumerian agriculture depended heavily on irrigation. The irrigation was accomplished by the use of shaduf, canals, channels, dykes, weirs, and reservoirs. The frequent violent floods of the Tigris, and less so, of the Euphrates, meant that canals required frequent repair and continual removal of silt, and survey markers and boundary stones needed to be continually replaced. The government required individuals to work on the canals in a corvée, although the rich were able to exempt themselves.

As is known from the Sumerian Farmer's Almanac, after the flood season and after the Spring equinox and the Akitu or New Year Festival, using the canals, farmers would flood their fields and then drain the water. Next they made oxen stomp the ground and kill weeds. They then dragged the fields with pickaxes. After drying, they plowed, harrowed, and raked the ground three times, and pulverized it with a mattock, before planting seed. Unfortunately, the high evaporation rate resulted in a gradual increase in the salinity of the fields. By the Ur III period, farmers had switched from wheat to the more salt-tolerant barley as their principal crop.

Sumerians harvested during the spring in three-person teams consisting of a reaper, a binder, and a sheaf handler. The farmers would use threshing wagons, driven by oxen, to separate the cereal heads from the stalks and then use threshing sleds to disengage the grain. They then winnowed the grain/chaff mixture.

=== Art ===
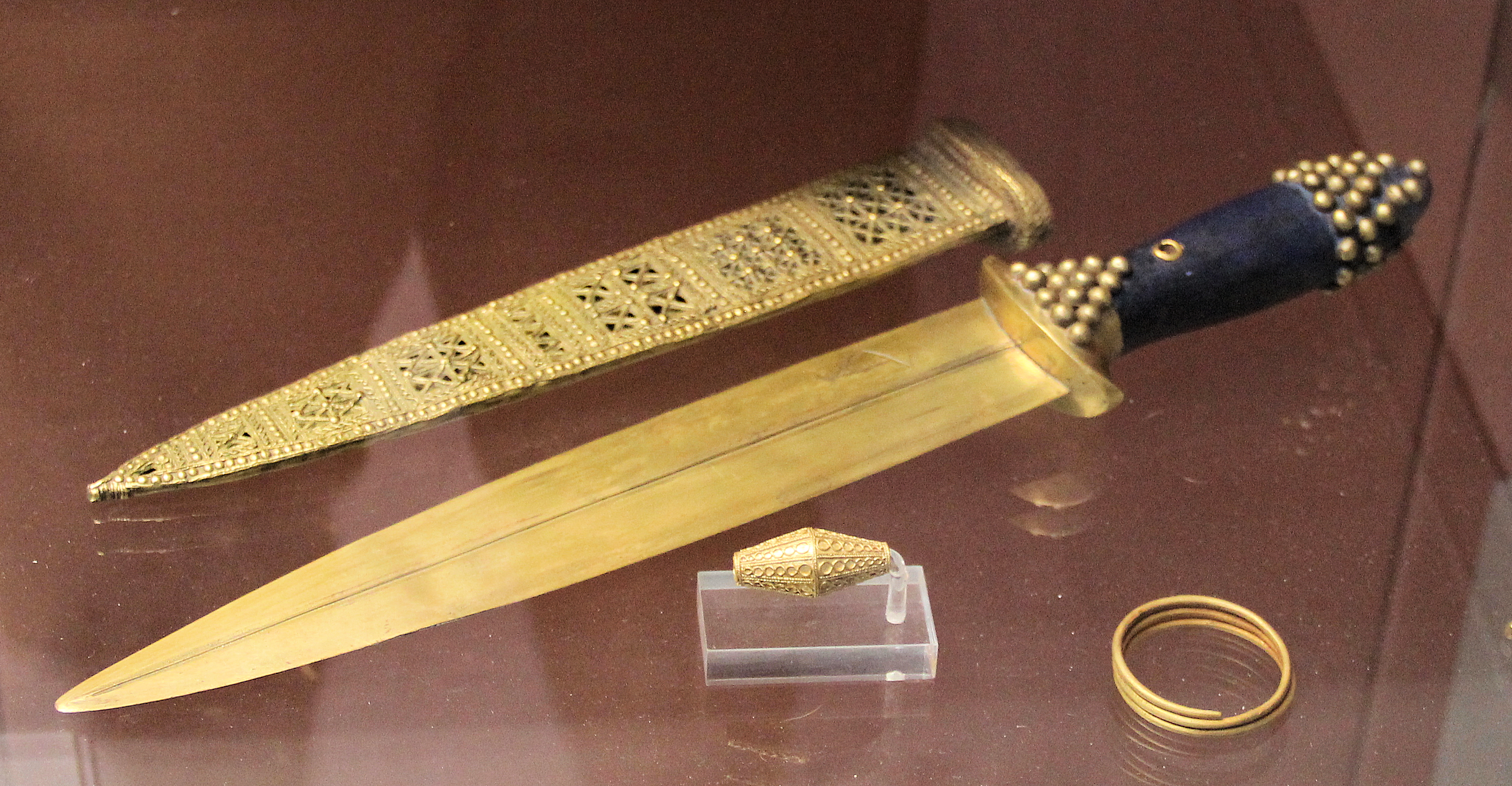
Gold dagger from Sumerian tomb PG 580, Royal Cemetery at Ur

The Sumerians were great artists. Sumerian artefacts show great detail and ornamentation, with fine semi-precious stones imported from other lands, such as lapis lazuli, marble, and diorite, and precious metals like hammered gold, incorporated into the design. Since stone was rare it was reserved for sculpture. The most widespread material in Sumer was clay, as a result many Sumerian objects are made of clay. Metals such as gold, silver, copper, and bronze, along with shells and gemstones, were used for the finest sculptures and inlays. Small stones of all kinds, including more precious stones such as lapis lazuli, alabaster, and serpentine, were used for cylinder seals.

Some of the most famous masterpieces are the Lyres of Ur, which are considered to be the world's oldest surviving stringed instruments. They were discovered by Leonard Woolley when the Royal Cemetery of Ur was excavated between 1922 and 1934.

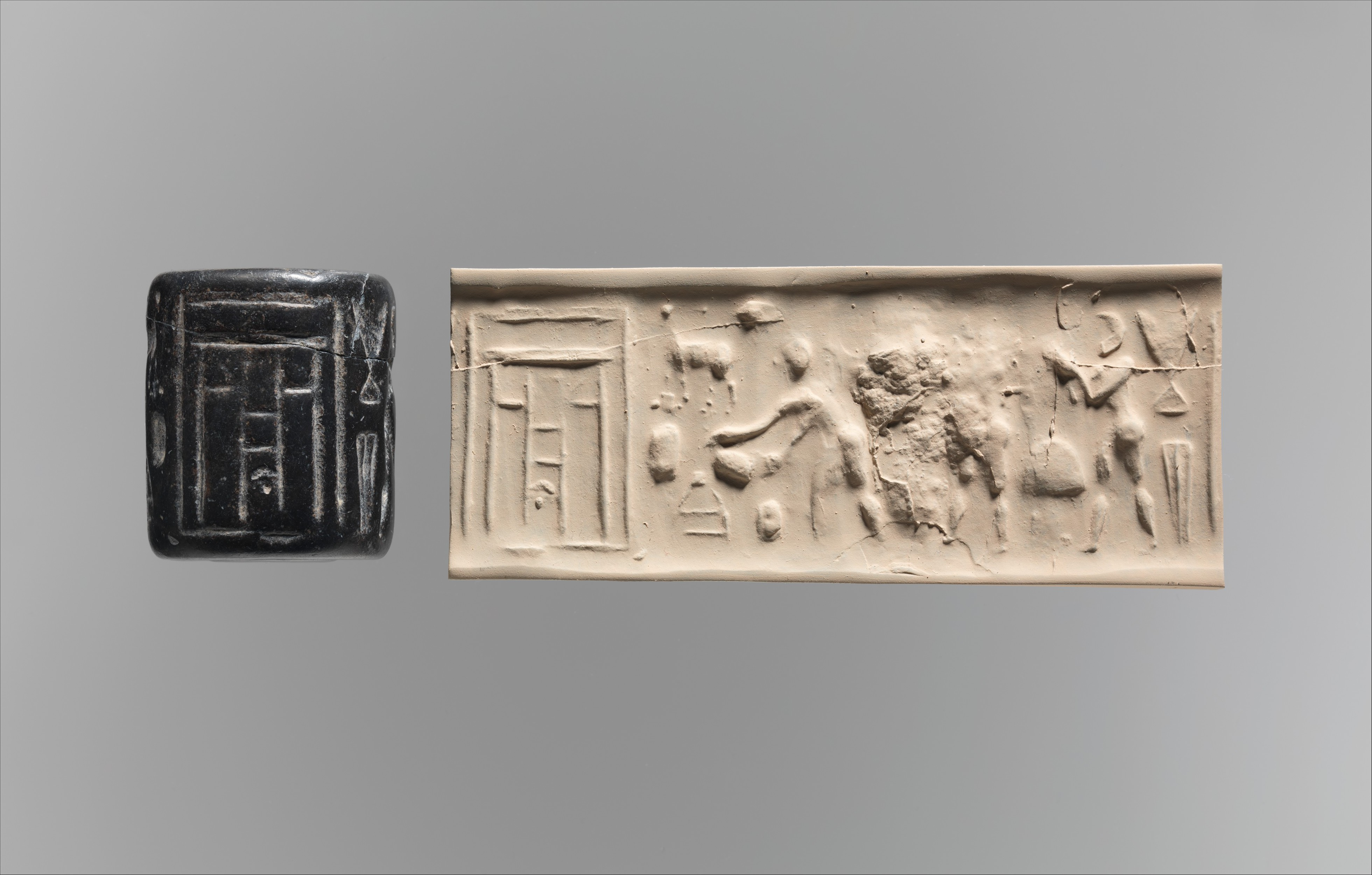
Cylinder seal and impression in which appears a ritual scene before a temple façade; 3500–3100 BC; bituminous limestone; height: 4.5 cm; Metropolitan Museum of Art (New York City)

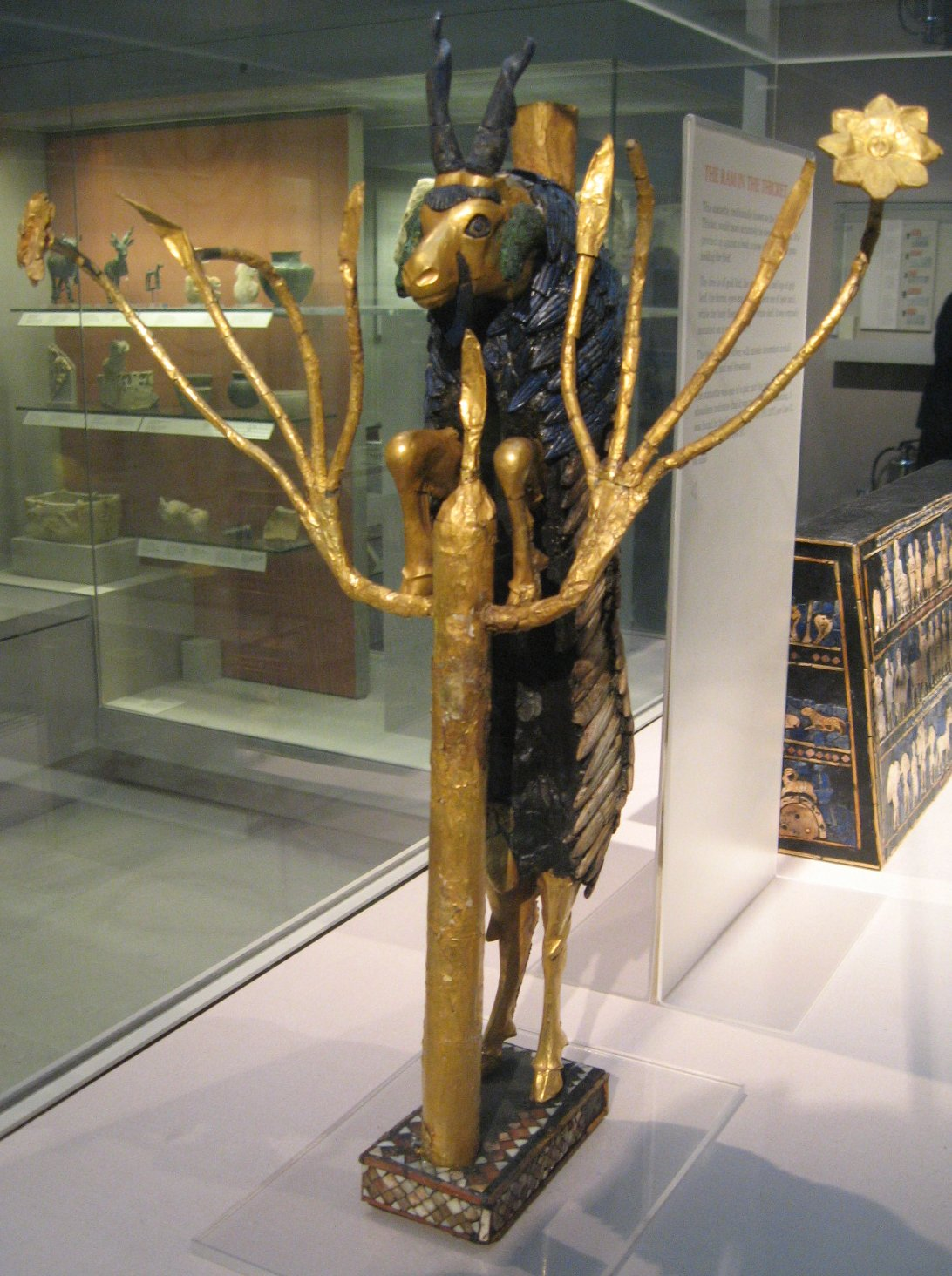
Ram in a Thicket; 2600–2400 BC; gold, copper, shell, lapis lazuli and limestone; height: 45.7 cm; from the Royal Cemetery at Ur (Dhi Qar Governorate, Iraq); British Museum (London)

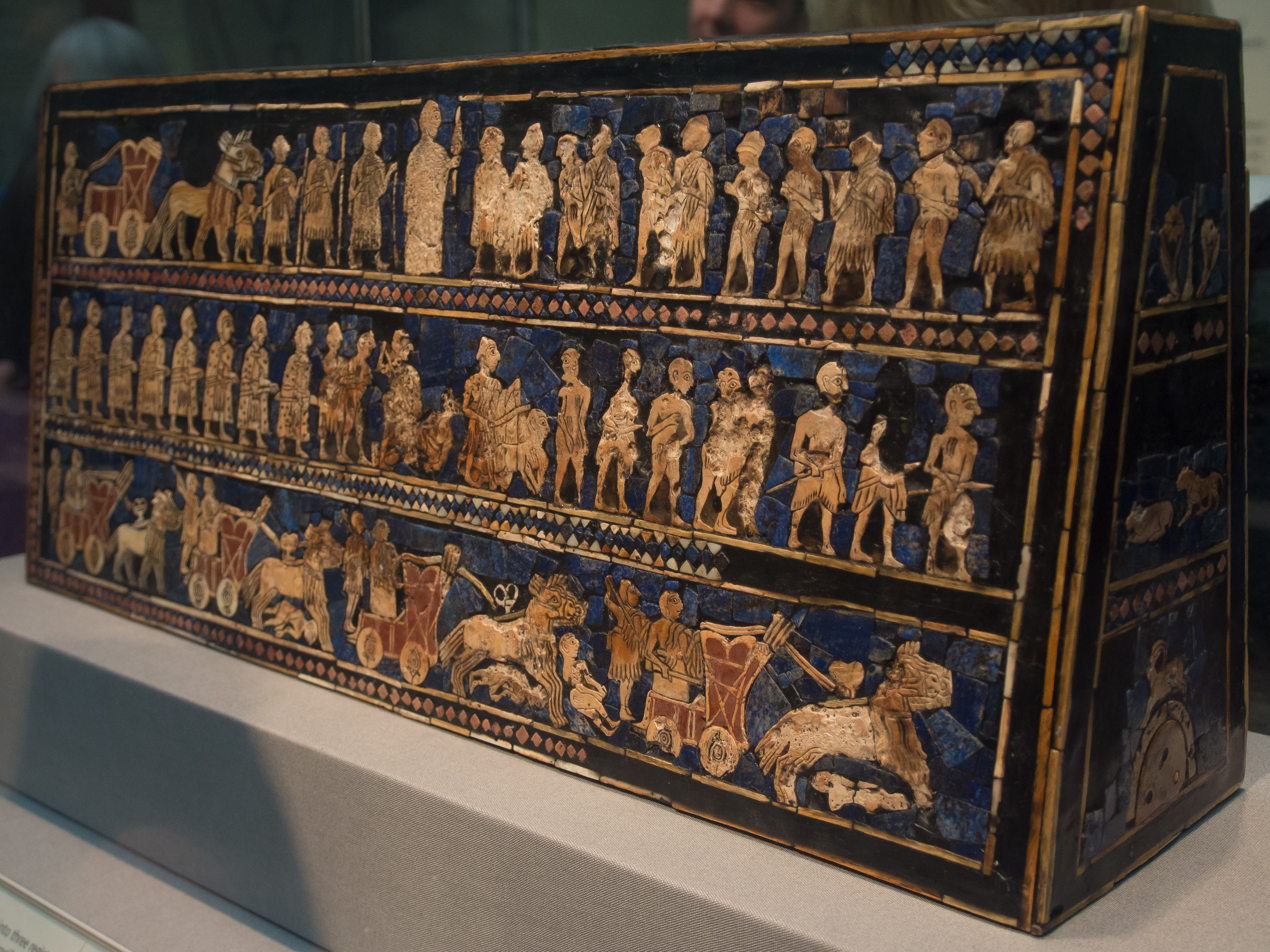
Standard of Ur; 2600–2400 BC; shell, red limestone and lapis lazuli on wood; length: 49.5 cm; from the Royal Cemetery at Ur; British Museum

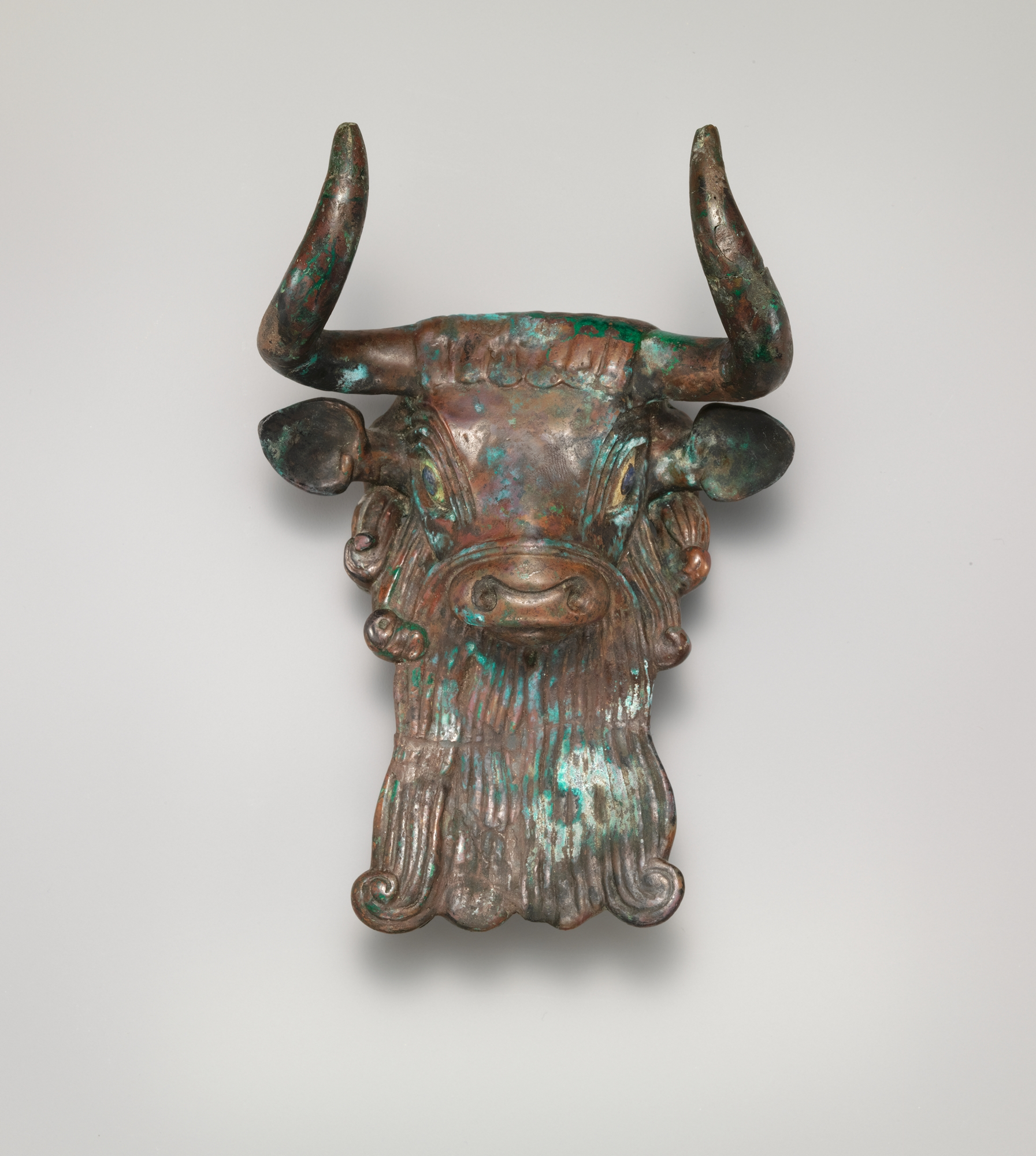
Bull's head ornament from a lyre; 2600–2350 BC; bronze inlaid with shell and lapis lazuli; height: 13.3 cm, width: 10.5 cm; Metropolitan Museum of Art

=== Architecture ===
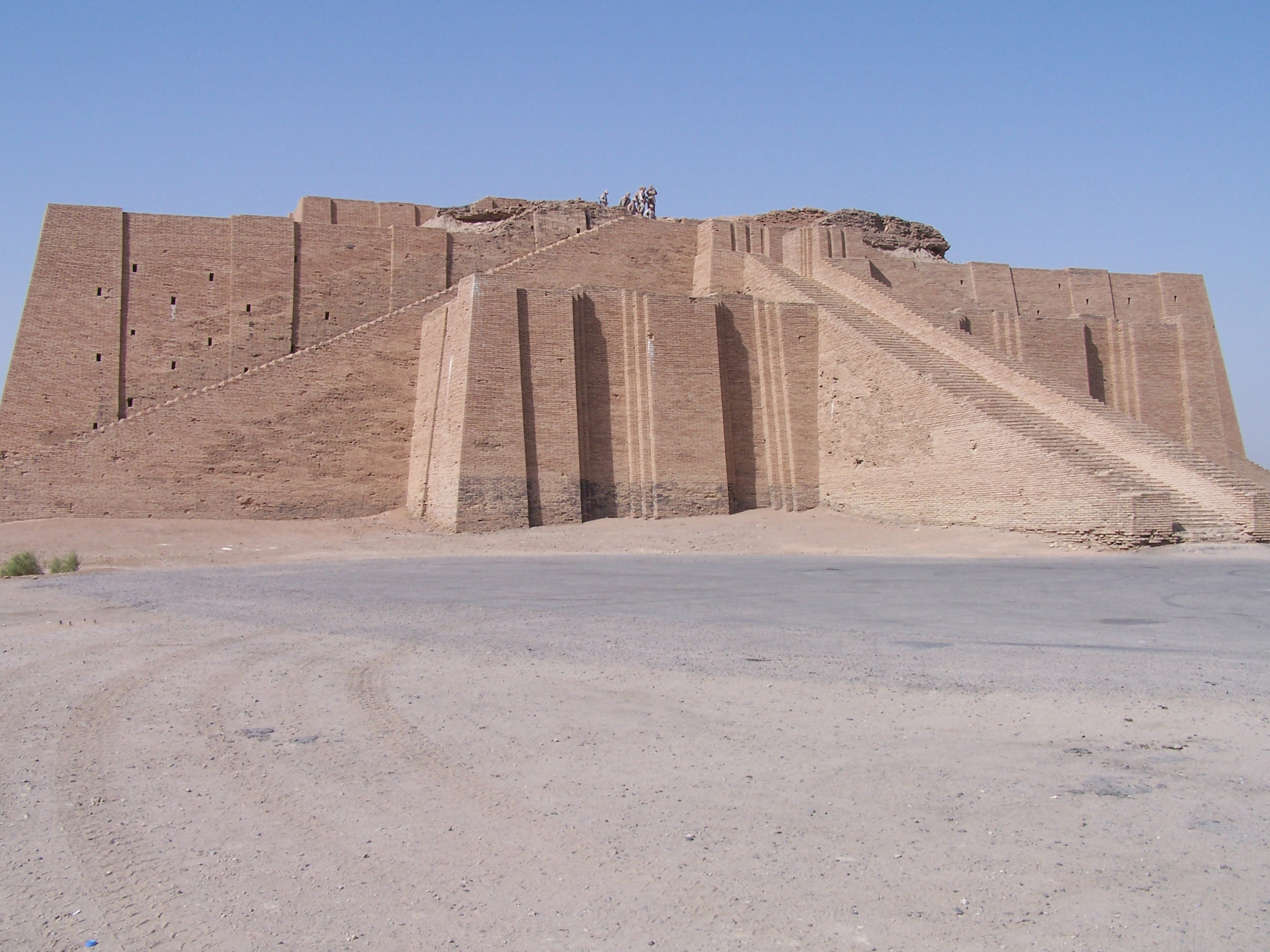
The Great Ziggurat of Ur (Dhi Qar Governorate, Iraq), built during the Third Dynasty of Ur (c. 2100 BC), dedicated to the moon god Nanna

The Tigris-Euphrates plain lacked minerals and trees. Sumerian structures were made of plano-convex mudbrick, not fixed with mortar or cement. Mud-brick buildings eventually deteriorate, so they were periodically destroyed, leveled, and rebuilt on the same spot. This constant rebuilding gradually raised the level of cities, which thus came to be elevated above the surrounding plain. The resultant hills, known as tells, are found throughout the ancient Near East.

According to Archibald Sayce, the primitive pictograms of the early Sumerian (i.e. Uruk) era suggest that "Stone was scarce, but was already cut into blocks and seals. Brick was the ordinary building material, and with it cities, forts, temples and houses were constructed. The city was provided with towers and stood on an artificial platform; the house also had a tower-like appearance. It was provided with a door which turned on a hinge, and could be opened with a sort of key; the city gate was on a larger scale, and seems to have been double. The foundation stones—or rather bricks—of a house were consecrated by certain objects that were deposited under them."

The most impressive and famous of Sumerian buildings are the ziggurats, large layered platforms that supported temples. Sumerian cylinder seals also depict houses built from reeds not unlike those built by the Marsh Arabs of Southern Iraq until as recently as 400 CE. The Sumerians also developed the arch, which enabled them to develop a strong type of dome. They built this by constructing and linking several arches. Sumerian temples and palaces made use of more advanced materials and techniques, such as buttresses, recesses, half columns, and clay nails.

=== Mathematics ===
The Sumerians developed a complex system of metrology c. 4000 BC. This advanced metrology resulted in the creation of arithmetic, geometry, and algebra. From c. 2600 BC onwards, the Sumerians wrote multiplication tables on clay tablets and dealt with geometrical exercises and division problems. The earliest traces of the Babylonian numerals also date back to this period. The period c. 2700 – c. 2300 BC saw the first appearance of the abacus, and a table of successive columns which delimited the successive orders of magnitude of their sexagesimal number system. The Sumerians were the first to use a place value numeral system. There is also anecdotal evidence the Sumerians may have used a type of slide rule in astronomical calculations. They were the first to find the area of a triangle and the volume of a cube.

=== Economy and trade ===
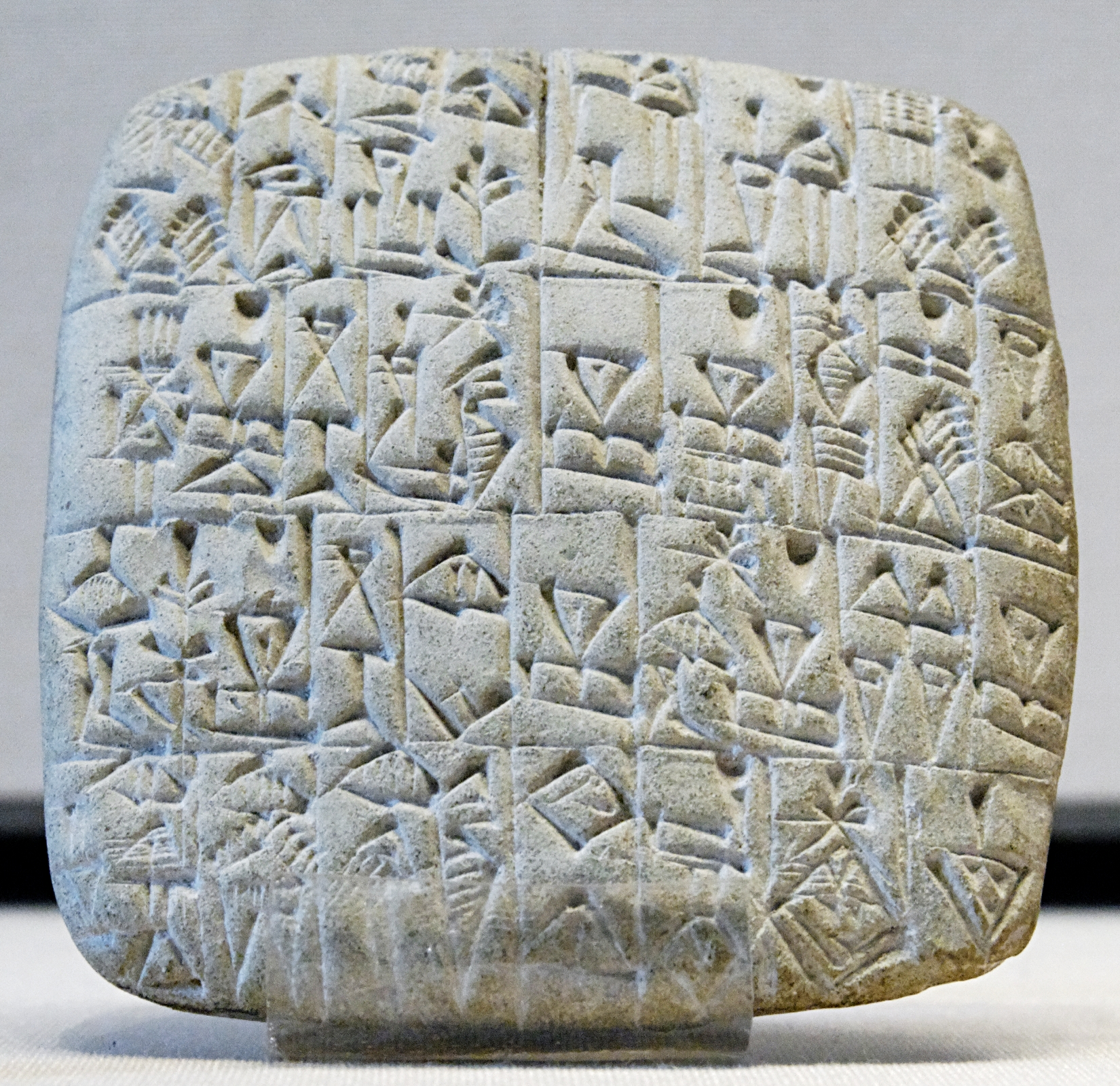
Bill of sale of a male slave and a building in Shuruppak, Sumerian tablet, c. 2600 BC

Discoveries of obsidian from far-away locations in Anatolia and lapis lazuli from Badakhshan in northeastern Afghanistan, beads from Dilmun (modern Bahrain), and several seals inscribed with the Indus Valley script suggest a remarkably wide-ranging network of ancient trade centered on the Persian Gulf. For example, Imports to Ur came from many parts of the world. In particular, the metals of all types had to be imported.

The Epic of Gilgamesh refers to trade with far lands for goods, such as wood, that were scarce in Mesopotamia. In particular, cedar from Lebanon was prized. The finding of resin in the tomb of Queen Puabi at Ur, indicates it was traded from as far away as Mozambique.

The Sumerians used slaves, although they were not a major part of the economy. Slave women worked as weavers, pressers, millers, and porters.

Sumerian potters decorated pots with cedar oil paints. The potters used a bow drill to produce the fire needed for baking the pottery. Sumerian masons and jewelers knew and made use of alabaster (calcite), ivory, iron, gold, silver, carnelian, and lapis lazuli.

==== Trade with the Indus valley ====
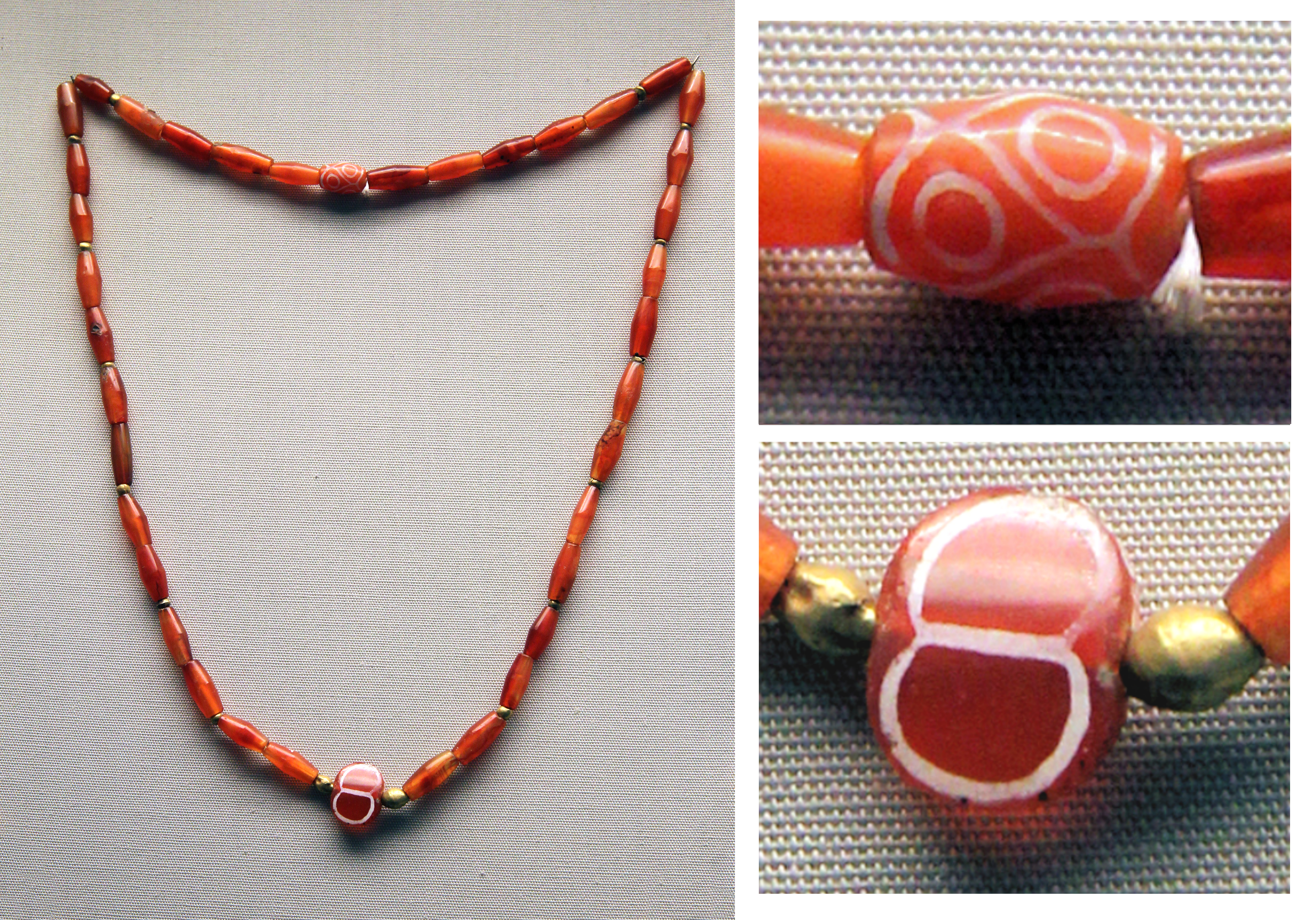
The etched carnelian beads with white designs in this necklace from the Royal Cemetery of Ur, dating to the First Dynasty of Ur, are thought to have come from the Indus Valley. British Museum.

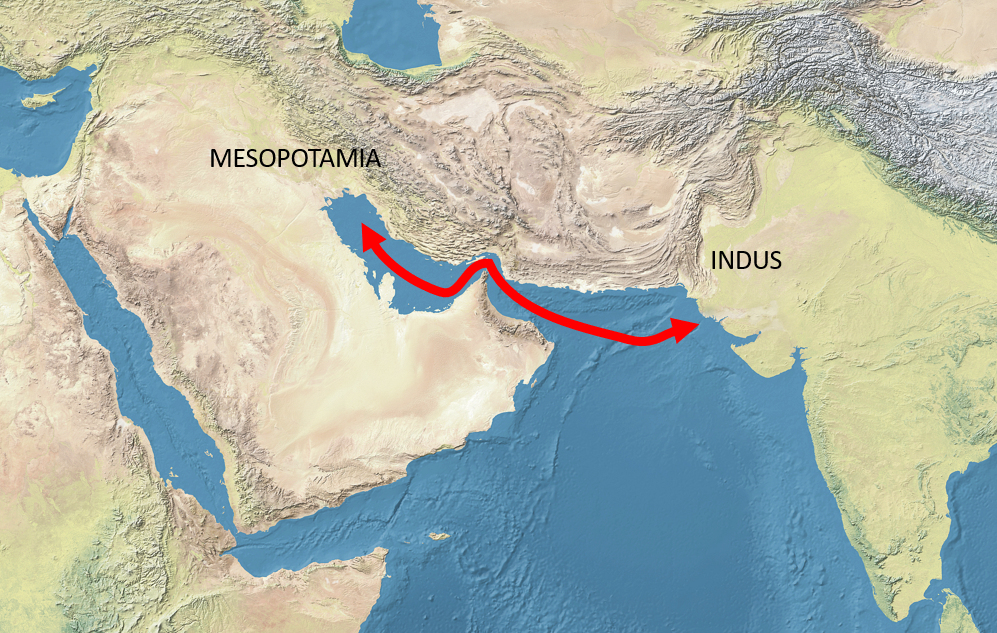
The trade routes between Mesopotamia and the Indus would have been significantly shorter due to lower sea levels in the 3rd millennium BC.

Evidence for imports from the Indus to Ur can be found from around 2350 BC. Various objects made with shell species that are characteristic of the Indus coast, particularly Turbinella pyrum and Pleuroploca trapezium, have been found in the archaeological sites of Mesopotamia dating from around 2500–2000 BC. Carnelian beads from the Indus were found in the Sumerian tombs of Ur, the Royal Cemetery at Ur, dating to 2600–2450. In particular, carnelian beads with an etched design in white were probably imported from the Indus Valley, and made according to a technique of acid-etching developed by the Harappans. Lapis lazuli was imported in great quantity by Egypt, and already used in many tombs of the Naqada II period (c. 3200 BC). Lapis lazuli probably originated in northern Afghanistan, as no other sources are known, and had to be transported across the Iranian plateau to Mesopotamia, and then Egypt.

Several Indus seals with Harappan script have also been found in Mesopotamia, particularly in Ur, Babylon and Kish.

Gudea, the ruler of the Neo-Sumerian Empire at Lagash, is recorded as having imported "translucent carnelian" from Meluhha, generally thought to be the Indus Valley area. Various inscriptions also mention the presence of Meluhha traders and interpreters in Mesopotamia. About twenty seals have been found from the Akkadian and Ur III sites, that have connections with Harappa and often use Harappan symbols or writing.

The Indus Valley Civilization only flourished in its most developed form between 2400 and 1800 BC, but at the time of these exchanges, it was a much larger entity than the Mesopotamian civilization, covering an area of 1.2 million square kilometers with thousands of settlements, compared to an area of only about 65,000 square kilometers for the occupied area of Mesopotamia, while the largest cities were comparable in size at about 30–40,000 inhabitants.

==== Money and credit ====
Large institutions kept their accounts in barley and silver, often with a fixed rate between them. The obligations, loans and prices in general were usually denominated in one of them. Many transactions involved debt, for example goods consigned to merchants by temple and beer advanced by "ale women".

Commercial credit and agricultural consumer loans were the main types of loans. The trade credit was usually extended by temples in order to finance trade expeditions and was nominated in silver. The interest rate was set at 1/60 a month (one shekel per mina) some time before 2000 BC and it remained at that level for about two thousand years. Rural loans commonly arose as a result of unpaid obligations due to an institution (such as a temple), in this case the arrears were considered to be lent to the debtor. They were denominated in barley or other crops and the interest rate was typically much higher than for commercial loans and could amount to 1/3 to 1/2 of the loan principal.

Periodically, rulers signed "clean slate" decrees that cancelled all the rural (but not commercial) debt and allowed bondservants to return to their homes. Customarily, rulers did it at the beginning of the first full year of their reign, but they could also be proclaimed at times of military conflict or crop failure. The first known ones were made by Enmetena and Urukagina of Lagash in c. 2400 – c. 2350 BC. According to Hudson, the purpose of these decrees was to prevent debts mounting to a degree that they threatened the fighting force, which could happen if peasants lost their subsistence land or became bondservants due to inability to repay their debt.

=== Military ===
Early chariots on the Standard of Ur, c. 2600 BC

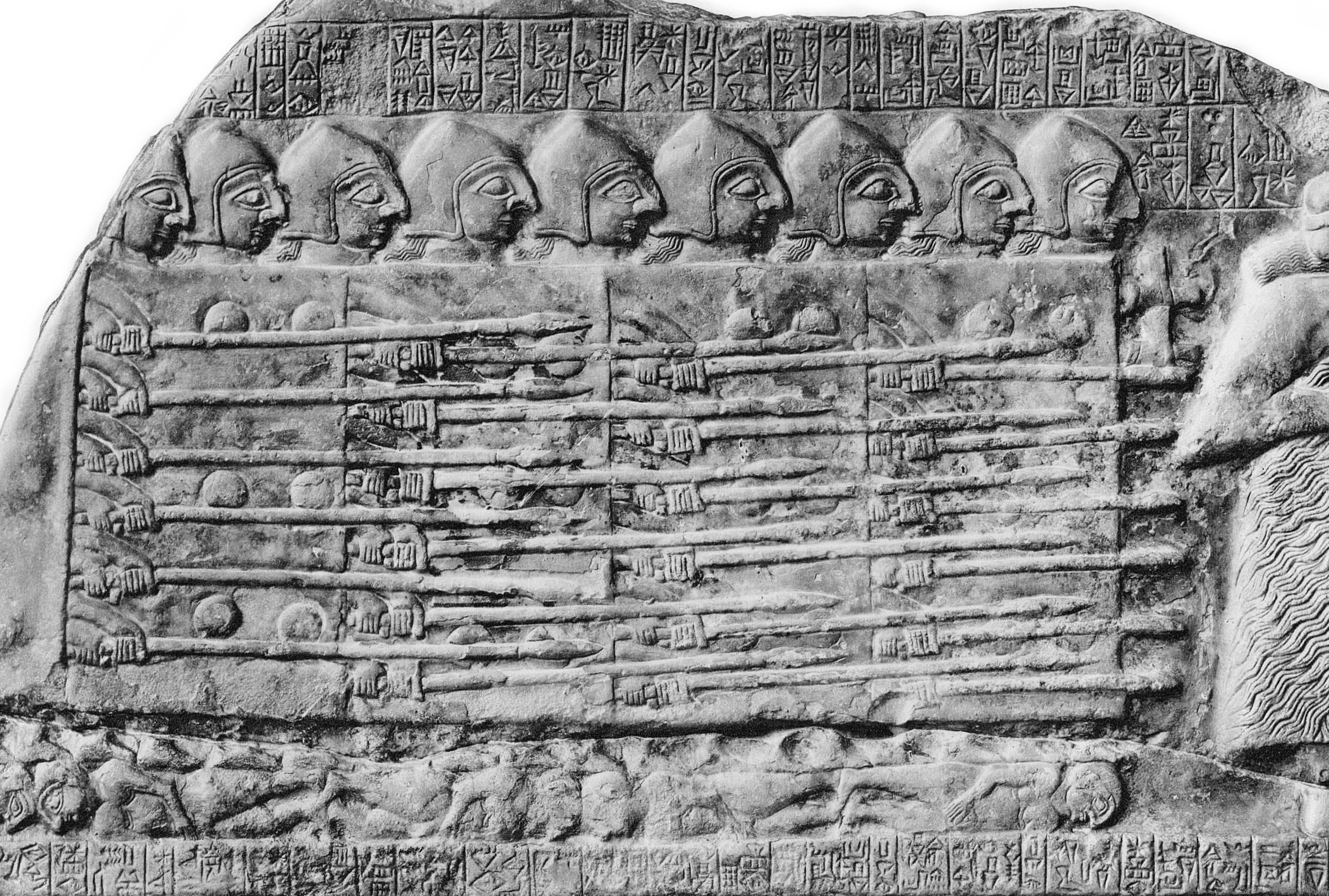
Phalanx battle formations led by Sumerian king Eannatum, on a fragment of the Stele of the Vultures

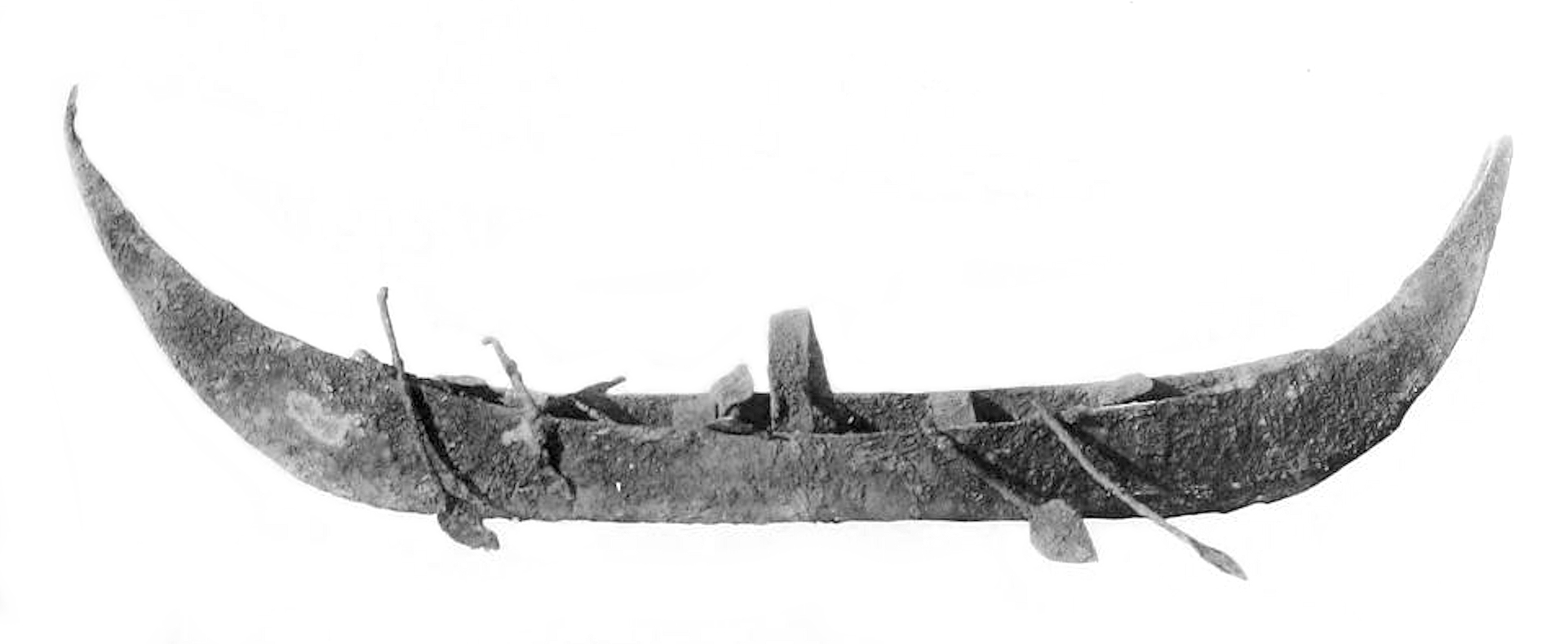
Silver model of a boat, tomb PG 789, Royal Cemetery of Ur, 2600–2500 BC

The almost constant wars among the Sumerian city-states for 2000 years helped to develop the military technology and techniques of Sumer to a high level. The first war recorded in any detail was between Lagash and Umma in c. 2450 BC on a stele called the Stele of the Vultures. It shows the king of Lagash leading a Sumerian army consisting mostly of infantry. The infantry carried spears, wore copper helmets, and carried rectangular shields. The spearmen are shown arranged in what resembles the phalanx formation, which requires training and discipline; this implies that the Sumerians may have used professional soldiers.

The Sumerian military used carts harnessed to onagers. These early chariots functioned less effectively in combat than did later designs, and some have suggested that these chariots served primarily as transports, though the crew carried battle-axes and lances. The Sumerian chariot comprised a four or two-wheeled device manned by a crew of two and harnessed to four onagers. The cart was composed of a woven basket and the wheels had a solid three-piece design.

Sumerian cities were surrounded by defensive walls. The Sumerians engaged in siege warfare between their cities, but the mudbrick walls were able to deter some foes.

=== Technology ===
Examples of Sumerian technology include: the wheel, cuneiform script, arithmetic and geometry, irrigation systems, Sumerian boats, lunisolar calendar, bronze, leather, saws, chisels, hammers, braces, bits, nails, pins, rings, hoes, axes, knives, lancepoints, arrowheads, swords, glue, daggers, waterskins, bags, harnesses, armor, quivers, war chariots, scabbards, boots, sandals, harpoons and beer. The Sumerians had three main types of boats:

- clinker-built sailboats stitched together with hair, featuring bitumen waterproofing
- skin boats constructed from animal skins and reeds
- wooden-oared ships, sometimes pulled upstream by people and animals walking along the nearby banks

== Legacy ==
Sumer and contemporary polities and cultures c. 3000 BC

Evidence of wheeled vehicles appeared in the mid-4th millennium BC, near-simultaneously in Mesopotamia, the Northern Caucasus (Maykop culture) and Central Europe. The wheel initially took the form of the potter's wheel. The new concept led to wheeled vehicles and mill wheels. The Sumerians' cuneiform script is the oldest (or second oldest after the Egyptian hieroglyphs) which has been deciphered (the status of even older inscriptions such as the Jiahu symbols and Tartaria tablets is controversial). The Sumerians were among the first astronomers, mapping the stars into sets of constellations, many of which survived in the zodiac and were also recognized by the ancient Greeks. They were also aware of the five planets that are easily visible to the naked eye.

They invented and developed arithmetic by using several different number systems including a mixed radix system with an alternating base 10 and base 6. This sexagesimal system became the standard number system in Sumer and Babylonia. They may have invented military formations and introduced the basic divisions between infantry, cavalry, and archers. They developed the first known codified legal and administrative systems, complete with courts, jails, and government records.

The first true city-states arose in Sumer, roughly contemporaneously with similar entities in what are now Syria and Lebanon. Several centuries after the invention of cuneiform, the use of writing expanded beyond debt/payment certificates and inventory lists to be applied for the first time, about 2600 BC, to messages and mail delivery, history, legend, mathematics, astronomical records, and other pursuits. Conjointly with the spread of writing, the first formal schools were established, usually under the auspices of a city-state's primary temple.

== See also ==
- Numeral system
- Ancient Mesopotamian units of measurement
- Ancient Mesopotamian religion
- Indus–Mesopotamia relations
- Egypt–Mesopotamia relations
- History of institutions in Mesopotamia
