= Samarra culture =

Late Neolithic archaeological culture of Mesopotamia

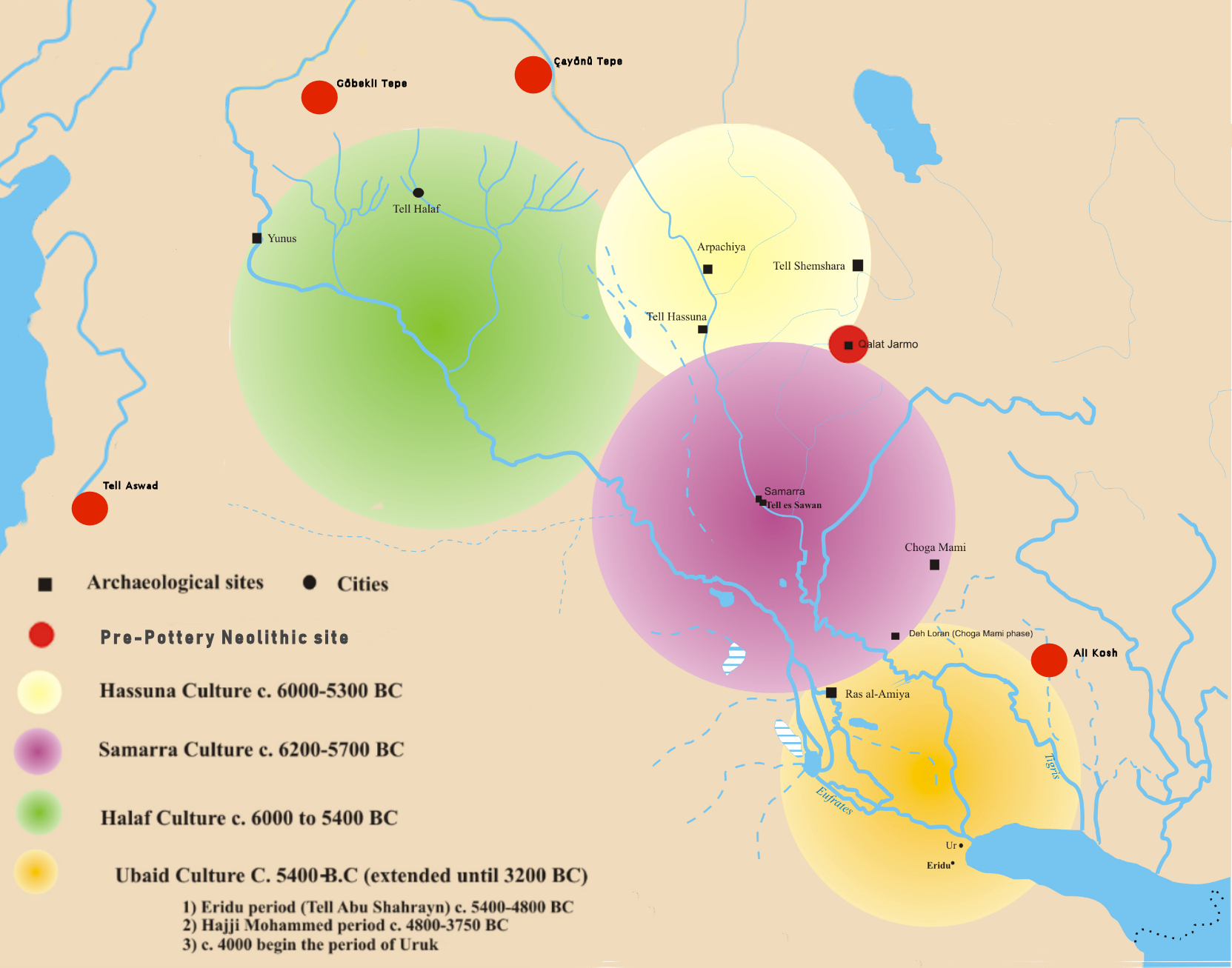
- Samarra culture (in violet ), next to Halaf, Hassuna and Ubaid cultures.
- Geographical range: Mesopotamia
- Period: Neolithic
- Dates: c. 5500 – c. 4800 BCE
- Type site: Samarra
- Major sites: Tell Shemshara, Tell es-Sawwan
- Preceded by: Pre-Pottery Neolithic B, Halaf culture, Hassuna culture, Halaf-Ubaid Transitional period
- Followed by: Ubaid period

Map of Iraq showing important sites that were occupied by the Samarra culture (clickable map)

The Samarra culture is a Late Neolithic archaeological culture of northern Mesopotamia, roughly dated to between 5500 and 4800 BCE. It partially overlaps with Hassuna and early Ubaid. Samarran material culture was first recognized during excavations by German Archaeologist Ernst Herzfeld at the site of Samarra. Other sites where Samarran material has been found include Tell Shemshara, Tell es-Sawwan, and Yarim Tepe.

At Tell es-Sawwan, evidence of irrigation—including flax—establishes the presence of a prosperous settled culture with a highly organized social structure. The culture is primarily known for its finely made pottery decorated with stylized animals, including birds, and geometric designs on dark backgrounds. This widely exported type of pottery, one of the first widespread, relatively uniform pottery styles in the Ancient Near East, was first recognized at Samarra. The Samarran Culture was the precursor to the Mesopotamian culture of the Ubaid period. At Tell Sabi Abyad and other Late Neolithic sites in Syria, scholars adopt increasingly vague terms such as Samarra "influenced", Samarra-"related" or even Samarra "impulses", largely because we do not understand the relationships with the traditional Samarra heartlands. The term may be extended to include sites in Syria such as Tell Chagar Bazar, Tell Boueid II, Tell Sabi Abyad or Tell Halula, where similar pottery is currently being excavated in Pre-Halaf to Early Halaf Transitional contexts.

== Samarra ware ==
The ceramic of this culture is named Samarra ware.

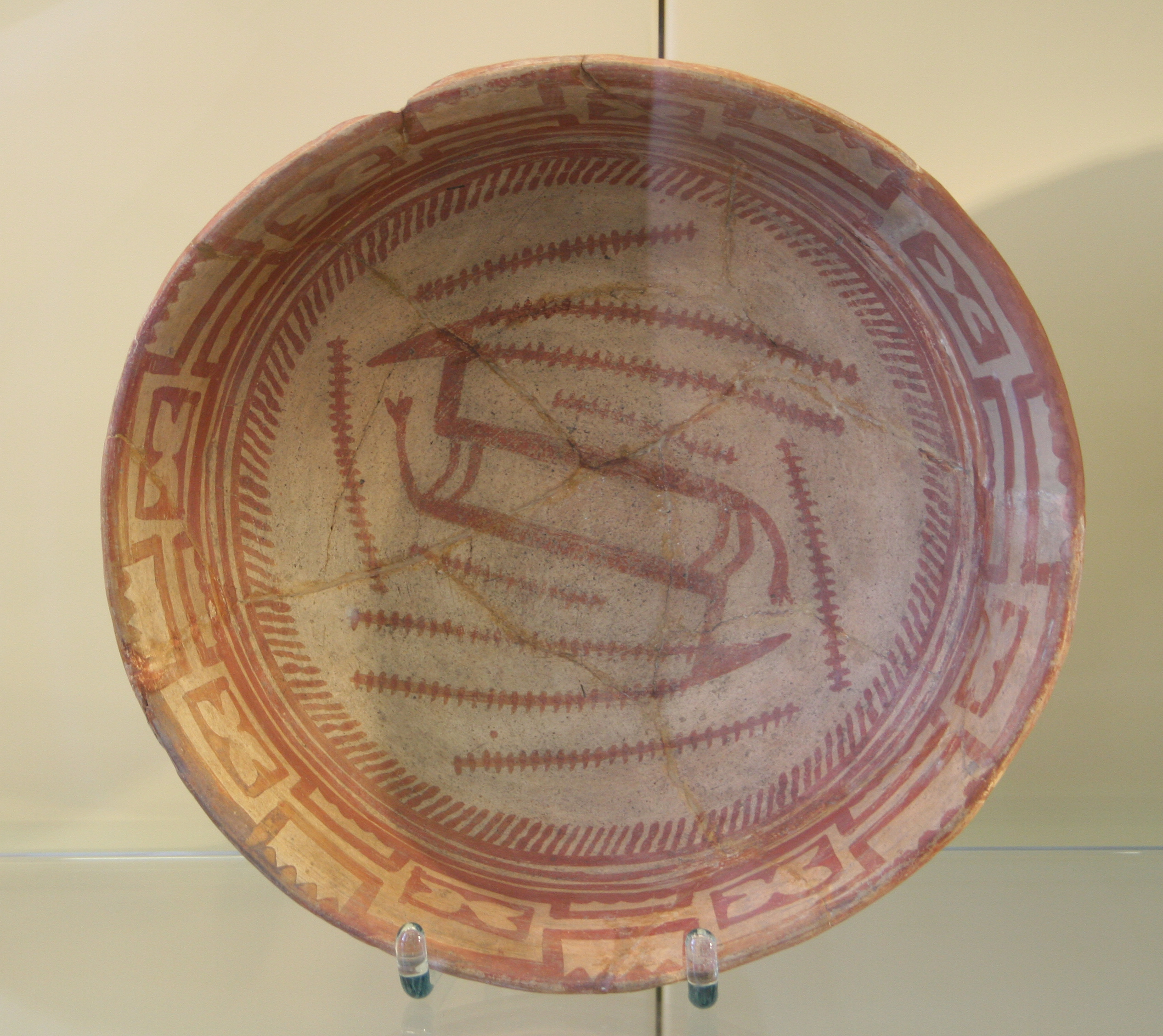
Samarra period fine ware, c. 6200–5700 BCE

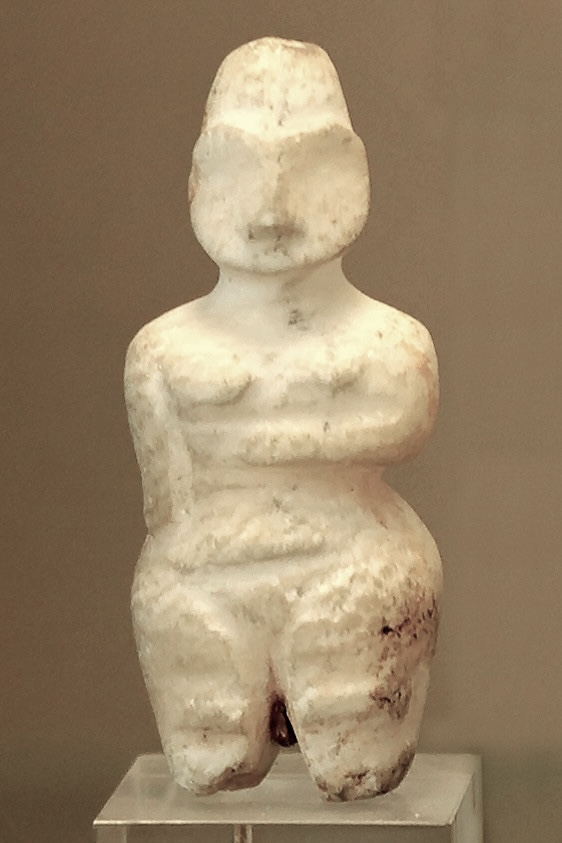
Female figurine found in the Tell es Sawwan (middle Tigris, near Samarra), level 1, ca. 6000 BCE

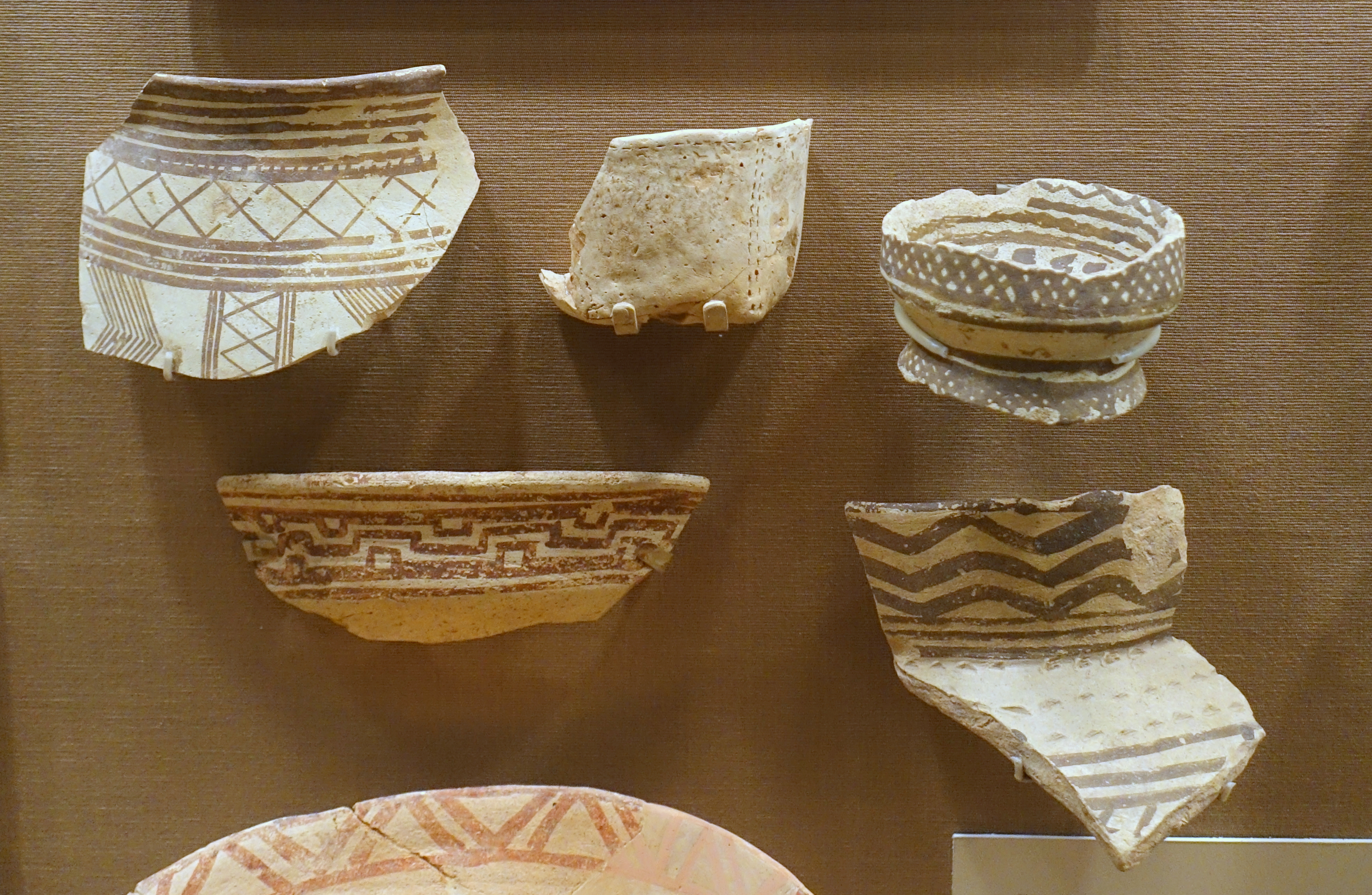
Fragment of Samarra pottery.

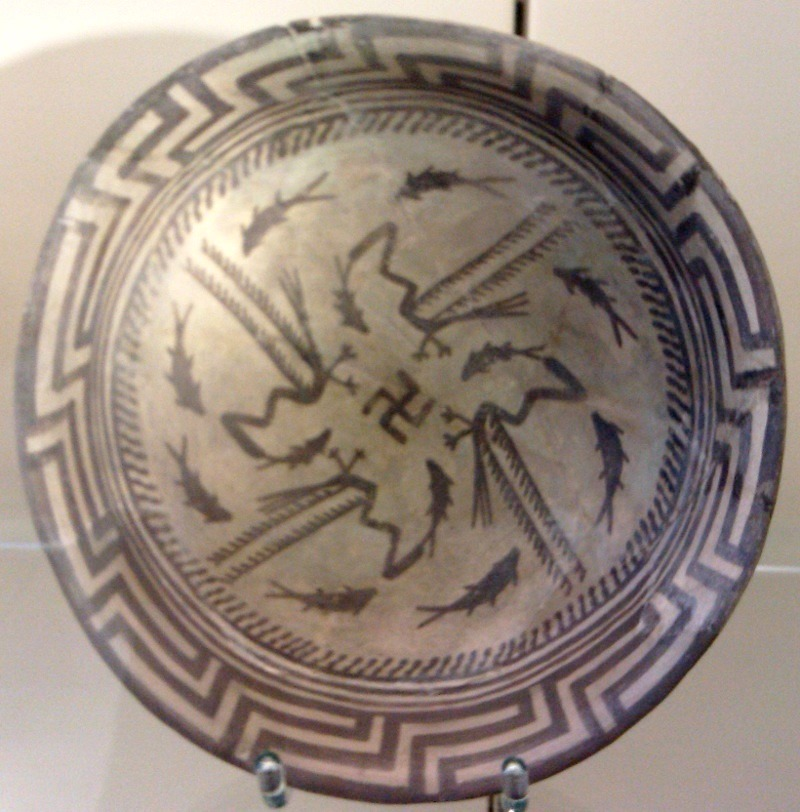
Samarra bowl, circa 4000 BCE

== See also ==
- Desert Kites
- Hassuna culture
- History of Mesopotamia
- Halaf culture
