= Tell Aqab =

Ancient settlement in Syria

- Location within Syria
- 37°3′29″N 40°53′44″E
- Type: Tell
- Location: Al-Hasakah Governorate, Syria
- Region: Northern Mesopotamia

Tell Aqab is an ancient Mesopotamian settlement located in northeastern Syria, occupied from the early Halaf period (c. 6000 BCE) to c. 3800 BCE. It is situated at the northern edge of the Khabur Plain near the headwaters of the Khabur tributary of the Euphrates, 6 km south-southeast of the town of Amuda in Jazira Canton. It is one of the few sites that contain material relating to the Halaf-Ubaid Transitional period, c. 5500–5000 BCE.

== Archaeological research ==
Characteristics and analysis of the pottery at Tell Aqab indicate that a large proportion of it is non-local and that there was a high level of trading activity with the nearby production centre of Chagar Bazar, some 15 km southwest of Tell Aqab.

Microscopic examination of the Ubaid pottery of Tell Aqab show that temper had been added to the clay of all analysed vessels. Temper is not present in any of the painted Halaf pots of Tell Aqab.

Marine shells have been found at Tell Aqab, linking it to further areas near the Mediterranean or Black Seas. Two specimens of Nassarius circumcinctus and one of Calliostoma zizyphinum, two sea snail species, were found in mid-to-late Halaf contexts at Tell Aqab. A 2003 survey of the distribution of shellfish in the "Seas of Turkey" found no C. zizyphinum nor N. circumcuntus in the Black Sea or Sea of Marmara, however both were found on the shores of the Mediterranean and Aegean Seas.

A gradual Halaf-Ubaid Transitional phase has been identified at Tell Aqab. Such a gradual transition has also been identified at other sites in Syria.

== Bibliography ==
- Davidson, T.E. & T. Watkins, 1981. Two seasons of excavations at Tell Aqab in the Jezirah, N.E. Syria. Iraq 43. 1-18
