= Yarim Tepe =

Coordinates: 36.32045°N 42.3675°E

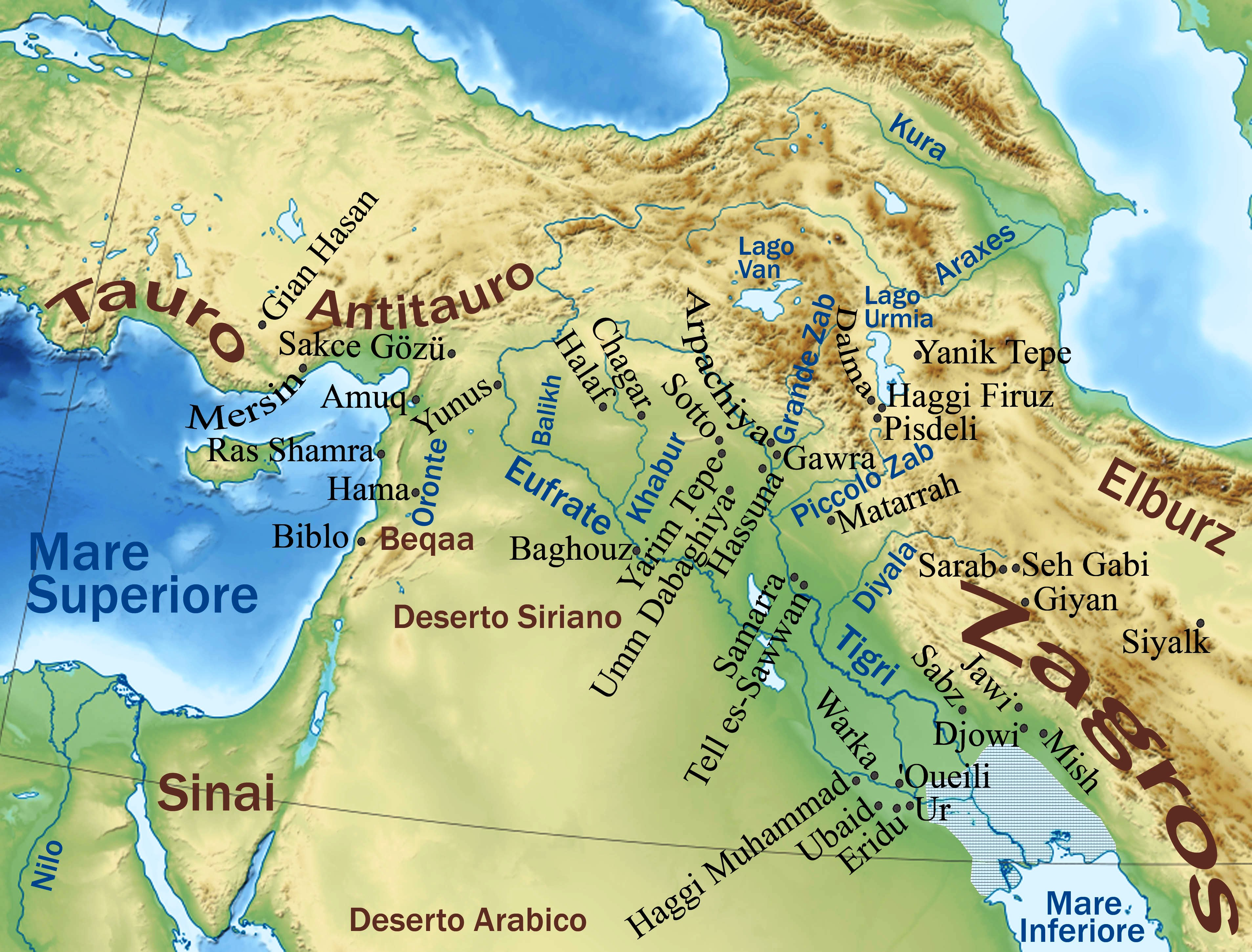
Yarim Tepe on the map of the Middle East during Chalcolithic age (centre)

Yarim Tepe is an archaeological site of an early farming settlement that goes back to about 6000 BC. It is located in the Sinjar valley some 7km southwest from the town of Tal Afar in northern Iraq. The site consists of several hills reflecting the development of the Hassuna culture, and then of the Halaf and Ubaid cultures.

The settlement was investigated between 1969 and 1976, and later by the Soviet archaeological expedition under the leadership of Rauf Munchaev and Nikolai Merpert.

== Yarim Tepe excavations ==
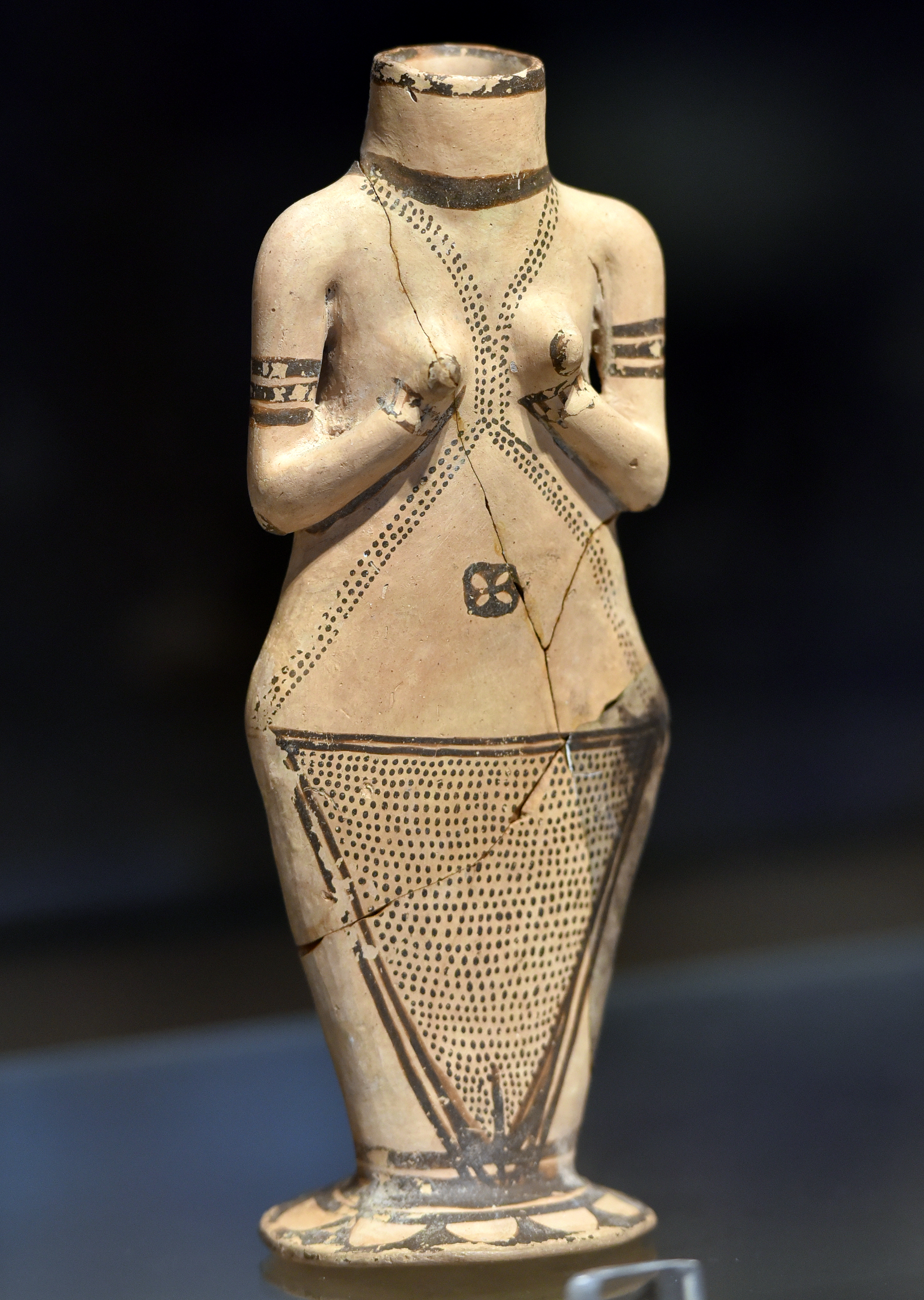
Painted vessel figurine of a nude woman from Yarim Tepe II settlement. Halaf culture, 5th millennium BCE. Iraq Museum

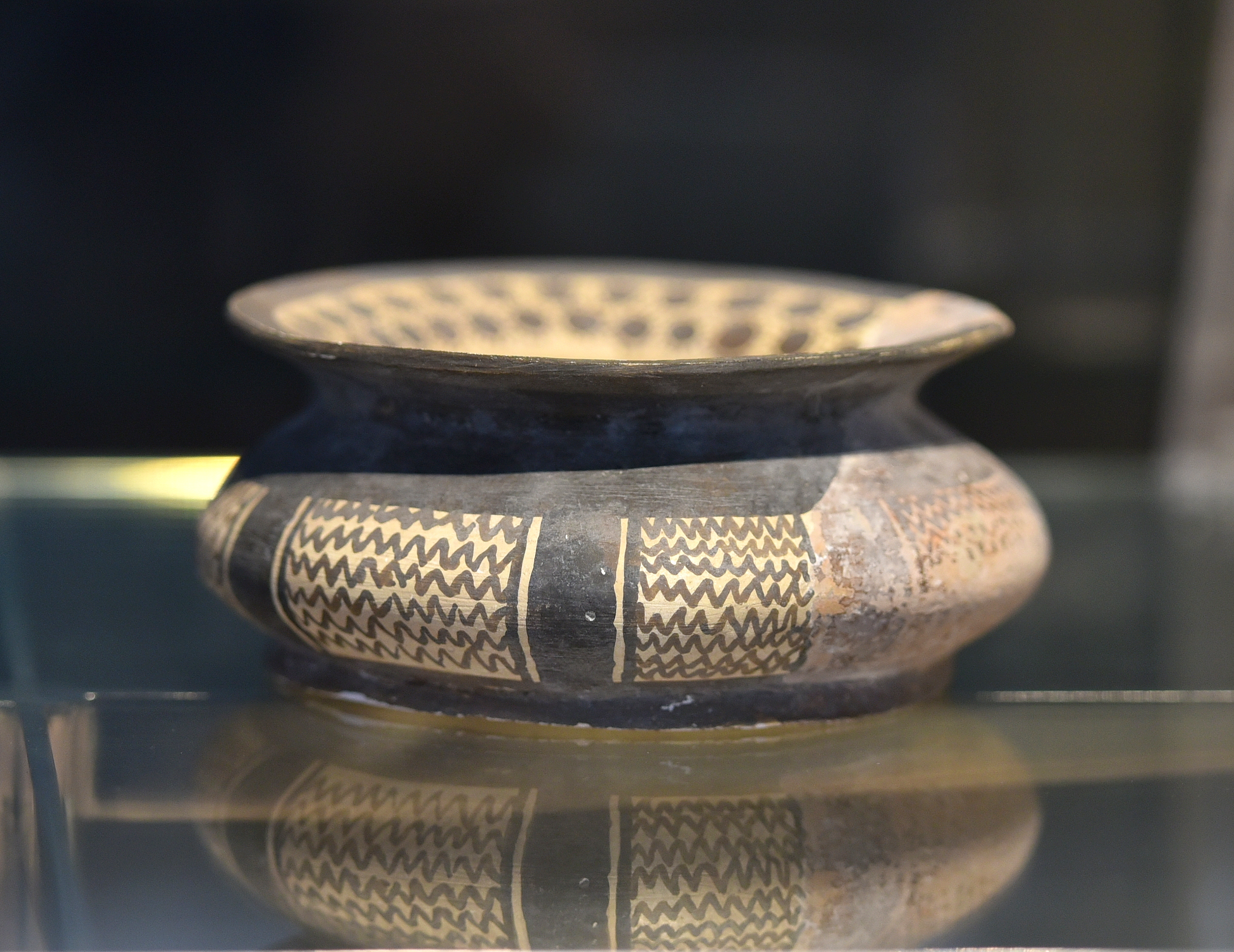
Painted pottery jar from Yarim Tepe. Halaf culture, 5th millennium BCE. Iraq Museum

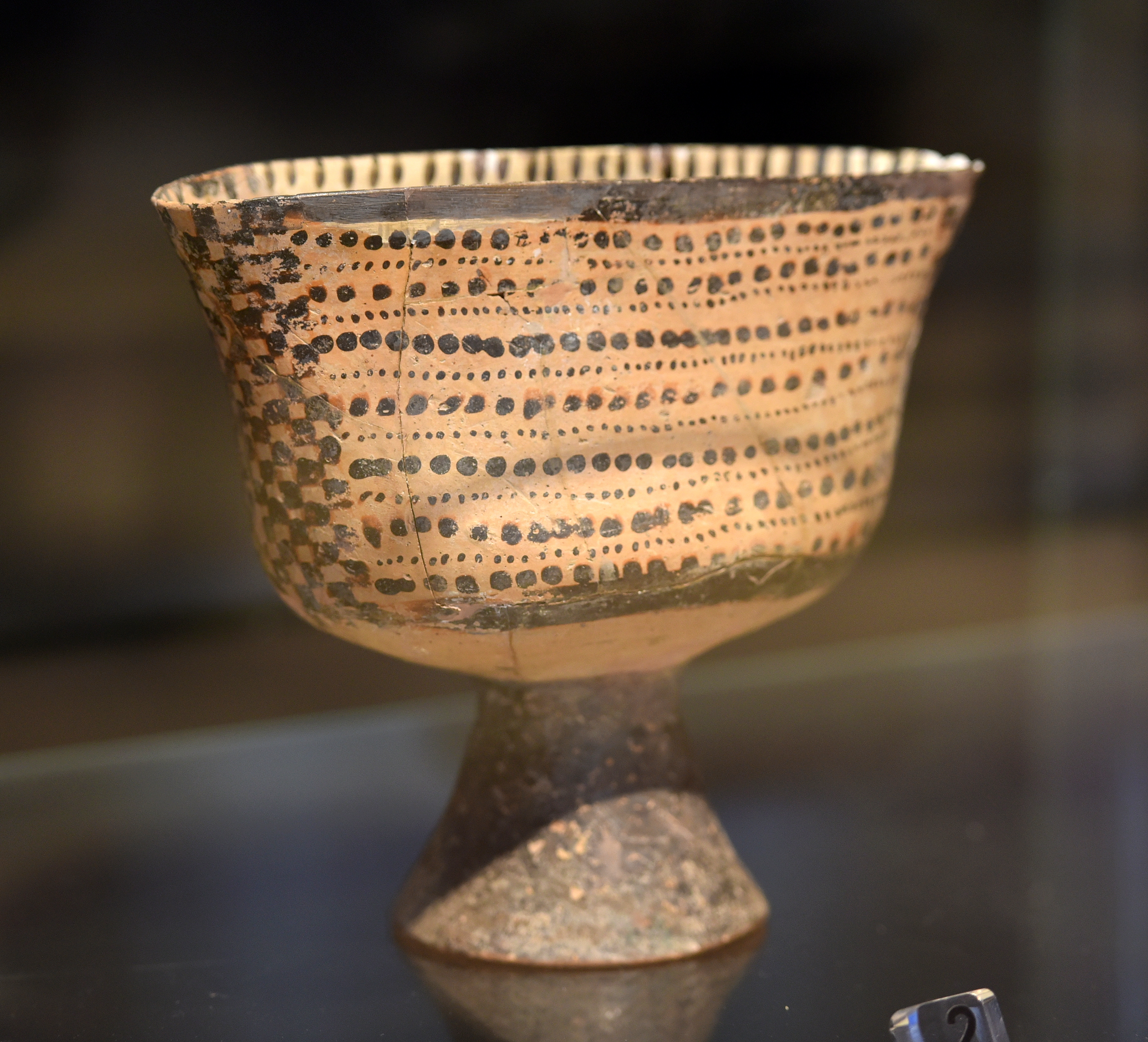
Painted pottery goblet from Yarim Tepe. Halaf culture, 5th millennium BCE. Iraq Museum

=== Yarim Tepe I ===
The hill known as Yarim-Tepe I belongs to Hassuna culture. The high central, oval-shaped core is 80 meters long and 30 meters wide. Some objects found here are reminiscent of those of Tureng Tepe in Iran.

13 building layers are found here, reflecting the main stages of this culture. The cultural level is 6.5 m deep. There are more than 1500 rectangular furnaces and ceramic ovens used for cooking. The earliest known kiln, dating to around 6000 BC, was found here.

The village had courtyards and small streets with rectangular mud-brick buildings. There were also public granaries. Burials of children in vessels were found, as well as various stone utensils, such as stone crushers, and hacksaws.

The findings also include ceramic vases, female clay figurines, and other items.

Metal items were also found, such as a lead bracelet, copper beads, as well as copper ore, which represents some of the oldest metallurgy in Mesopotamia.

Bovine bones were also found.

=== Yarim Tepe II ===
Yarim Tepe II is a settlement of the Halafian culture, belonging to the fifth millennium BC. It is located 250 m west of Yarim Tepe I, and is partly eroded by the nearby brook Joubara Diariasi. Almost all of the dwellings are small one-room mud brick houses of the tholos plan.

The cultural level is 7 m deep, and it consists of ten structural horizons. The bones of both domestic and wild animals were found, among them the bones of sheep, ox, goats, and pigs.

Ceramic figured vessels in the shape of elephants and women were found among other pottery. Some ceramic containers have pictures of fish, birds, gazelles and other animals on them.

Some pendant seals were also discovered, including a very old copper seal.

The burial customs included cremations, and the burials of skulls

=== Yarim Tepe III ===
Yarim Tepe III is located right next to Yarim Tepe II. The hill is 10 m high. The pottery is typical for Northern Ubaid and Halaf. It was excavated in 1978-79.

At least three Ubaid building levels are found here on top of several Halaf levels. The uppermost levels of the Halaf cultural deposits are analogous to the Arpachiyah levels TT-6 to TT-8, and Tepe Gawra levels XVIII-XX. Three stone seal-pendants have also been found.

In 1985, Narimanov made comparisons between the Chaff-Faced Ware from Leyla-Tepe and the evidence from Yarim Tepe III. He believed that these parallels were due to the migration of some Ubaid culture representatives into Transcaucasia in the first half of the 4th millennium BC.

== Metallurgy ==
Metal was already quite common at Yarim Tepe; as many as 21 examples of worked copper or copper ore were found in the lower levels of the settlement.

Even more remarkably, the earliest use of lead is also documented.

"The earliest lead (Pb) finds in the ancient Near East are a 6th millennium BC bangle from Yarim Tepe in northern Iraq and a slightly later conical lead piece from Halaf period Arpachiyah, near Mosul. As native lead is extremely rare, such artifacts raise the possibility that lead smelting may have begun even before copper smelting."

== Kul Tepe (Iraq) ==
Kul Tepe (Iraq) is a related site located about 6 kilometers due west from Yarim tepe. Two mounds there (Kul Tepe I, and Kul Tepe II) have been excavated. The lowest level of Kultepe I contains material of Sotto type (from nearby Tell Sotto), and above it there is archaic Hassuna materials.

The lowest level also contains three high quality marble vessels, with parallels at Tell es-Sawwan and Umm Dabaghiyah.

== See also ==
- Tell Maghzaliyah
- Tell Arpachiyah
- Jarmo

== Bibliography ==
- Brereton, Gareth, "Excavations at Yarim Tepe on the Gorgan Plain, Iran, 1960–62: The David Stronach Archives", Vol. 9. Oxbow Books, 2026
- Natalia Petrova, A technological study of Hassuna culture ceramics (Yarim Tepe I settlement). Documenta Praehistorica XXXIX (2012)
- Yarim Tepe I. In N. Yoffee, J. J. Clark (eds.), Early stages in the evolution of Mesopotamian civilization. Soviet excavations in Northern Iraq. The University of Arizona Press, Arizona: 73–114 (1972, 1993 reprint) ISBN 0816513937.
- Merpert N. Ya. 1993. The archaic phase of the Hassuna culture. In N. Yoffee, J. J. Clark (eds.), Early stages in the evolution of Mesopotamian civilization. Soviet excavations in Northern Iraq. The University of Arizona Press, Arizona: 115–127.
- Munchaev R. M., Merpert N. Ya.1981. Earliest Agricultural Settlements of Northern Mesopotamia. Nauka Press. Moscow. (in Russian)
- Merpert, Nikolai I., and Rauf M. Munchaev. 1987. “The Earliest Levels at Yarim Tepe I and Yarim Tepe II in Northern Iraq.” Iraq 49:1–37
- Merpert, Nikolai I., and Rauf M. Munchaev. 1973. “Early Agricultural Settlement in the Sinjar Plain, Northern Iraq.” Iraq 35:97–113
