= Tepe Gawra =

Mesopotamian settlement in Iraq

- Location within Iraq
- 36°29′44″N 43°15′37″E
- Type: tell
- Location: Nineveh Province, Iraq
- Region: Northern Mesopotamia

Site notes
- Excavation dates: 1849, 1927, 1932-1938, 2022
- Archaeologists: Austen Layard, E.A. Speiser, Charles Bache, Khaled Abu Jayyab

Tepe Gawra (also Tepe Gaura) is an ancient Mesopotamian settlement 24 km (15 mi) NNE of Mosul in northwest Iraq that was occupied between 5000 and 1500 BC. It is roughly a mile from the site of Nineveh and 2 miles E of the site of Khorsabad. It contains remains from the Halaf period, the Ubaid period, and the Uruk period (4000–3100 BC). Tepe Gawra contains material relating to the Halaf-Ubaid Transitional period c. 5,500–5,000 BC.

Tell Arpachiyah is a contemporary Neolithic site nearby. At Yarim Tepe, located about 70 km (43 mi) to the west of Gawra, the uppermost levels of the Halaf cultural deposits are analogous to the Arpachiyah levels TT-6 to TT-8, and Tepe Gawra levels XVIII-XX.

== Archaeology ==
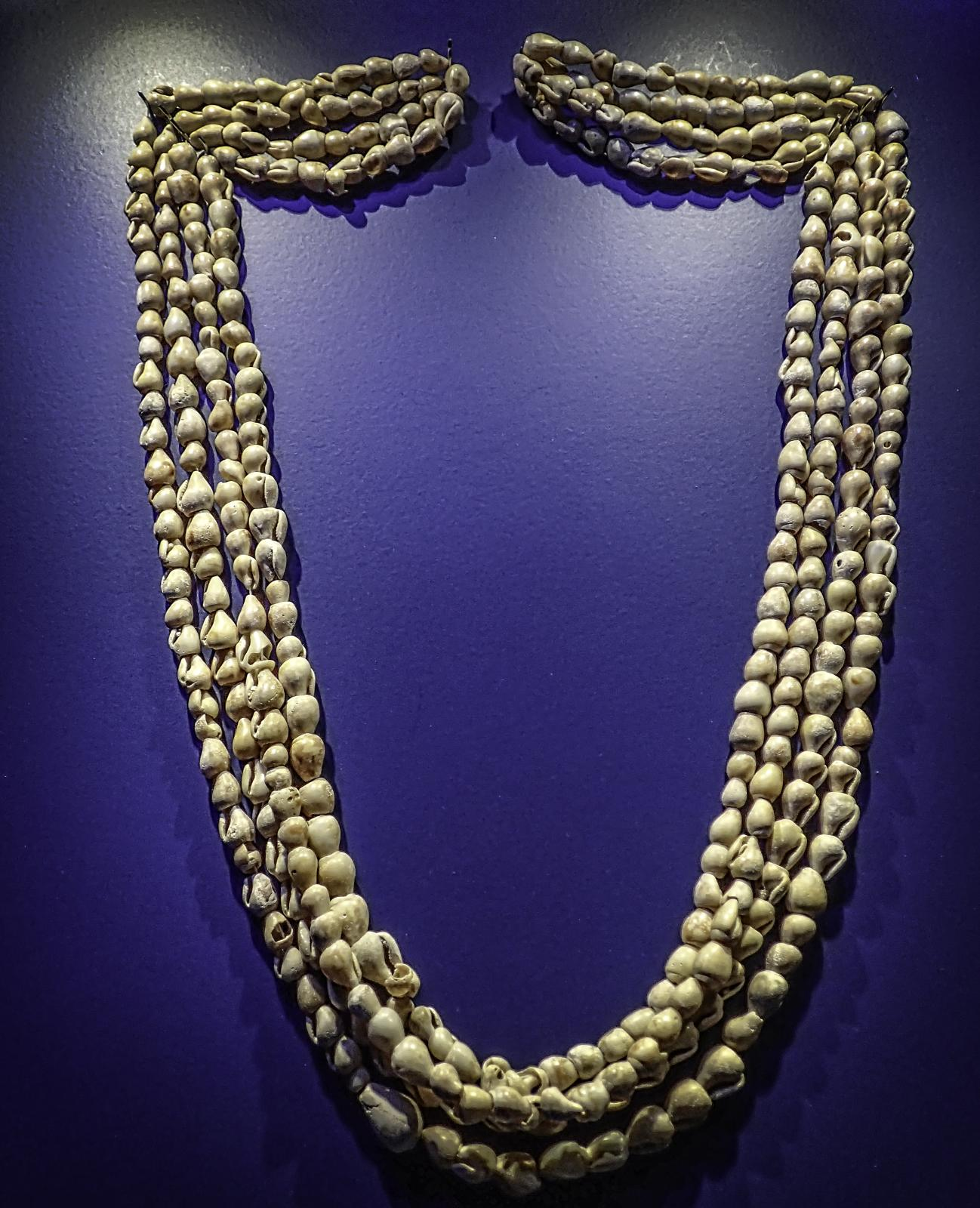
Columbella Rustica snail shell necklace from Tepe Gawra 4000 BC

The site of Tepe Gawra is 120 metres (390 ft) in diameter and 22 metres (72 ft) high. A brief exploratory dig was performed by Austen Layard in 1849 who stated "By my directions deep trenches were opened into its sides, but only fragments of pottery were discovered". The site was formally excavated in 1927 and between 1932 and 1938 by archaeologists from a joint expedition of the University of Pennsylvania and the American Schools of Oriental Research. After a 15 day trial excavation in 1927 which opened a sounding trench on the southeast slope of the main mound the 1932, 1933, and 1936 seasons were led by Ephraim Avigdor Speiser. In the remaining seasons the team was led by Charles Bache. At the same time, these scholars explored the related nearby ancient site of Tell Billa, which is located about 8 km (5.0 mi) southwest of Gawra.

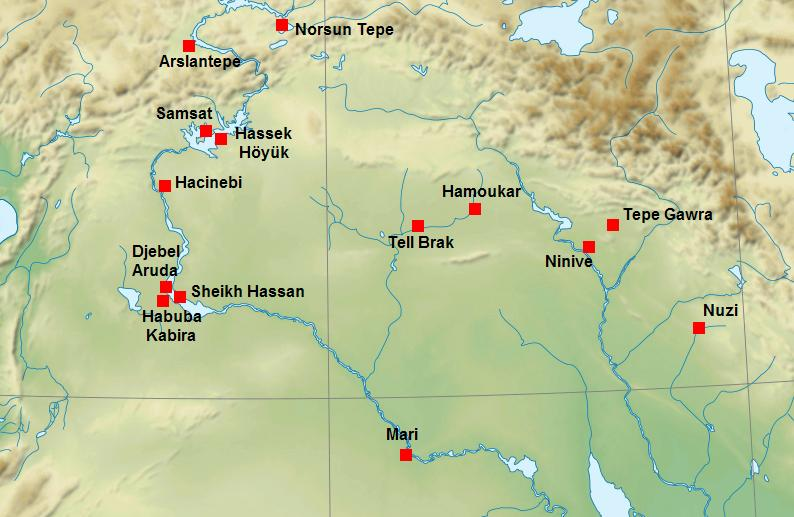
Tepe Gawra on the map of Uruk period archaeological sites in Upper Mesopotamia and Anatolia

Burials were found in graves and tombs. Graves took the form of inhumations, urn burial, side-wall graves, and pisé graves. Tombs ranged from mudbrick to stone and grave goods included ivory combs and gold foil. While most work concentrated on the main mound, two deep soundings were conducted on the adjacent plain, recovering early Halaf pottery shards and simple construction. Small finds included thousands of beads, mostly stone and shell, and a number of implements of stone and obsidian. These included knives, razor blades, 100 flint arrowheads, mace heads, and a large number of sling stones. Also found was one of the earliest known distillation apparatus (dated c. 3500 BC), 46 centimeters high.

Although no epigraphy was recovered at the site about 700 seals and sealings were found. This included 5 stamp seals from the Halaf and 34 from the Ubaid. These seals were of the geometric and the animal design types. Stamp seals were found as late as Level VII and not later. Cylinder seals were found in Levels VII and VI.

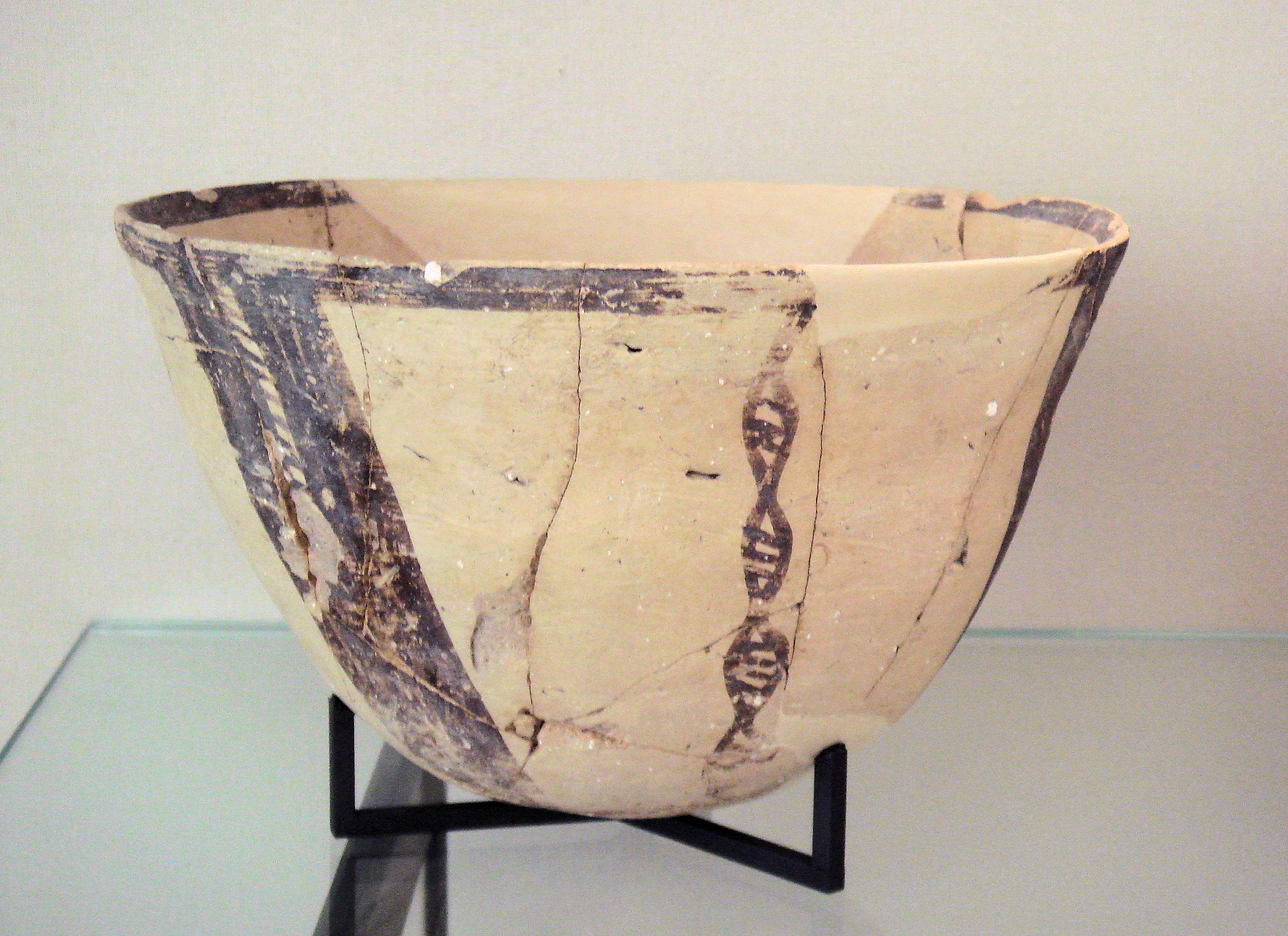
Early Ubaid period pottery, 5100-4500 BC, Tepe Gawra. Louvre

The excavators defined the stratigraphy as follows:

- Levels XX - Halaf (c. 5500-4900 BC). Structures included a 5 meter diameter mud brick tholos
- Levels s XIX-XVII, XVI-XV, XIII, and XII - Ubaid (c. 4900-4000 BC)
  - Level XIX - Large residence with a courtyard and at least 20 rooms
  - Level XIII - Three large temples built partially superimposed over earlier temples. The Northern Temple measured 12.25 meters by 8.65 meters
  - Level XII - Site violently destroyed by conflagration. Dead bodies found in street.
- Levels XIIa-VIII - Gawra Period (c. 4000-2900 BC) Contemporary with Uruk period and Jemdat Nasr period
  - Level XIa - Large circular fortress built
  - Level VIIIc - Four large buildings built deemed temples by the excavators. Later work indicates some were of an administrative nature
- Levels VII-IV - Early Dynastic, Akkadian, Neo-Sumerian and Isin-Larsa periods (c. 2900-1800 BC)

In 2001, Mitchell Rothman reanalyzed the data from previous excavations that did not use precise stratigraphic techniques. He considerably clarified the stratigraphy of the site.

A team from the University of Toronto led by Khaled Abu Jayyab has begun to address the issue or whether or not there was a Lower Town at the site. In October 2021 a preliminary visit to the site found a dense scatter of Late Chalcolithic pottery shards on the plain around the mound. Satellite imagery, both legacy (Corona and Keyhole), and modern (Landsat) were then examined which identified two smaller tells, one to the north of the main mound and one to the east separated from the main mound by dry stream beds. The northern tell was noted on the 1930s excavation topographic map. A drone survey was used to produce a digital elevation model and a 3D model. In 2022 a systemic surface survey of the site was conducted, collecting pottery shards and stone tools. The 1930s excavation removed at least the top 7 meters of the main mound completely and half the mound beginning at Level X through Level IV. Spoil had been dumped down the side of the mound. Modern olive groves, planted about 30 years ago have significantly damaged the site, especially the lower town. In recent years the terrorist group ISIS dug extensive tunnels in the main mound to the point where collapse is a concern. The main study result was that a 24 hectare Lower Town existed at the site in the late 3rd millennium BC.

== Occupation history ==
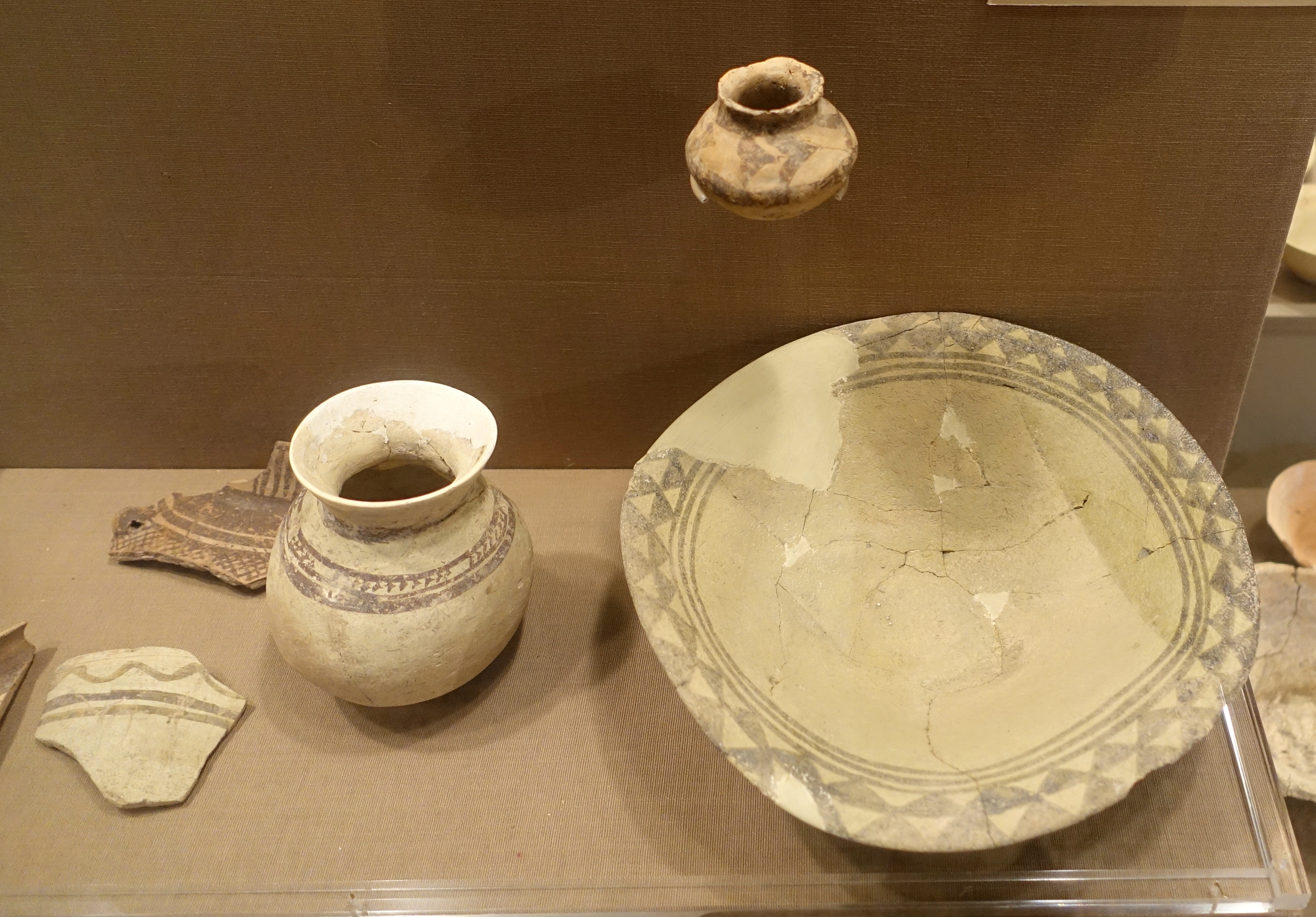
Northern Ubaid pottery from Tepe Gawra and other sites

Excavations at Tepe Gawra revealed 16 levels showing that the Tepe Gawra site was occupied from approximately 5000 BC to 1500 BC with only a few short gaps in occupation, though virgin soil was not reached. In that period a number of spring fed streams ran through or near the site, now all dry due to modern pumping and deep wells in the area to support the olive groves that surround the mound. They include the earliest known temple to be decorated with pilasters and recesses. The Gawra Period (3500–2900 BC), contemporary with Uruk period and Jemdat Nasr period, is named for the site. The earliest temple was dated to the LC2 period, approximately 4200 BC. The site was part of the Uruk Expansion, as the city of Uruk extended its trading network into Syria, Iran, and northern Mesopotamia (Tepe Gawra, Grai Resh, Nineveh, and Tell al-Hawa).

== Earliest use of gold ==
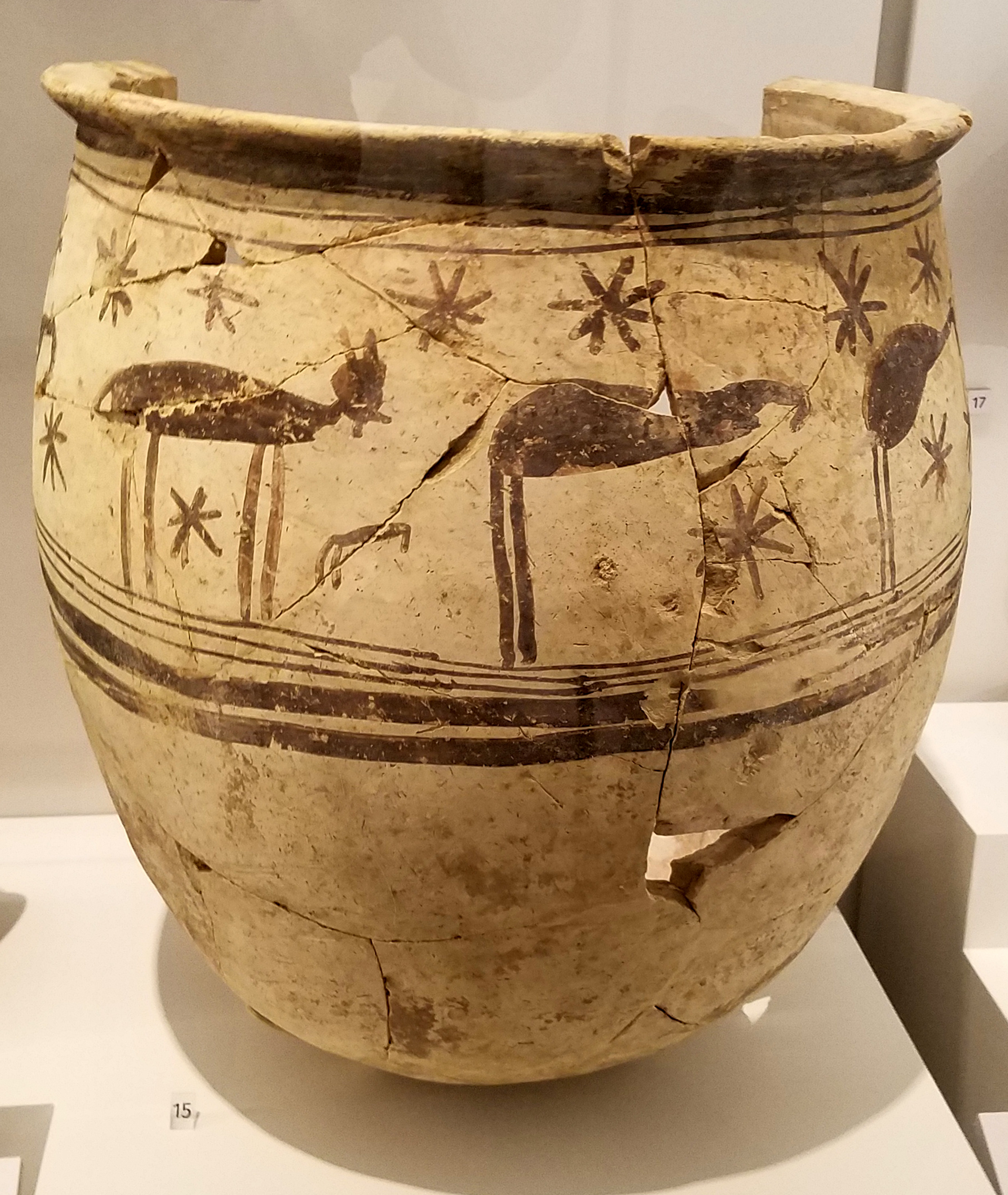
Tepe Gawra Storage Jar

According to Daniel Potts, the earliest evidence for gold or electrum use in the Near East comes from Ur and Tepe Gawra; a few small artifacts, such as wire and beads, have been found at these sites. At Tepe Gawra, the use of gold and electrum continued into the Early Dynastic period, starting about 2900 BC. Finds included, in Level XI burials, "rosettes of gold foil with centres of coloured stone set in bitumen".

Several objects from levels 12 to 8 (mid-fourth to early-third millennium BC) at Tepe Gawra were made of arsenical copper, which is quite early for Mesopotamia. Similar objects are also found in Fara (Shuruppak), also dating from Jemdet Nasr period. A single tin-bronze pin was found at the site, on Level VII.

== See also ==
- Cities of the Ancient Near East
