= Halaf-Ubaid Transitional period =

Prehistoric period of Mesopotamia

- Geographical range: Mesopotamia
- Period: Neolithic 3 – Pottery Neolithic (PN)
- Dates: c. 5500–5000 BC
- Type site: Tepe Gawra
- Preceded by: Halaf culture
- Followed by: Ubaid period

Map of Iraq showing important sites that were occupied during the Halaf-Ubaid Transitional period (clickable map)

The Halaf-Ubaid Transitional period or HUT (c. 5500/5400 to 5200/5000 BC) is a prehistoric period of Mesopotamia. It lies chronologically between the Halaf period and the Ubaid period. It is still a complex and rather poorly understood period. At the same time, recent efforts were made to study the gradual change from Halaf style pottery to Ubaid style pottery in various parts of North Mesopotamia.

== Archaeology ==
Archaeologically, the period has been studied anew recently by a number of scholars. The Halaf appears to have ended around 5200 BC, and the northern Ubaid begins around then. There are several sites that run from the Halaf until the Ubaid.

Previously, only two such sites were well known. The first of these, Tepe Gawra, was excavated in the 1930s when stratigraphic controls were lacking, causing difficulties in re-creating the sequence. The second, Tell Aqab, remained largely unpublished. This made definitive statements about the period difficult. But with the present state of archaeological knowledge, more certainty is emerging.

== Sites with abrupt transition ==
Tell Arpachiyah and Tepe Gawra are the sites where the transition from Halaf to Ubaid were quite abrupt. No transitional levels were observed at these two important sites.

== Gradual transition ==
A. L. Perkins identified the existence of a Halaf-Ubaid Transition phase that can be seen in ceramic assemblages. Sites like Tell el-'Oueili, and Choga Mami in the Mandali region were suggested as witnesses to this phase.

More recently, a Halaf-Ubaid Transitional phase has been attested in Syria, in such places as Tell Zeidan, Tell Aqab, Tell Kurdu, Tell Masaikh (near Terqa, also known as Kar-Assurnasirpal, pl:Kar-Aszurnasirpal), and Chagar Bazar.

Halaf-Ubaid Transitional pottery from Tell Begum, in the Shahrizor plain, is particularly plentiful. Shahrizor plain is located between the Mesopotamian plains and the Iranian plateau, so it is geographically significant.

Recent analysis (2016) indicates that, in the Ashur region, as well as on the Shahrizor Plain, the settlement intensity, as well as the overall site numbers remained rather similar throughout the Halaf and Ubaid periods.
