= Tell es-Sawwan =

Tell es Sawwan
- Location within Iraq
- 34°07′16″N 43°54′18″E
- Type: settlement
- Periods: Ubaid, Hassuna, and Samarra culture
- Location: Saladin Province, Iraq

History
- Built: 5th millennium BC

Site notes
- Excavation dates: 1964-1971
- Archaeologists: Behnam Abu Al-Soof. Khalid Ahmad Al-a'dami, Walid Yasin
- Condition: Ruined
- Owner: Public
- Public access: Yes

Tell es-Sawwan is an important Samarran period archaeological site in Saladin Province, Iraq. It is located 110 kilometres (68 mi) north of Baghdad, and south of Samarra. It lies on a 12 meter high cliff overlooking the Tigris River.

The site is a primarily Ubaid, Hassuna, and Samarra culture occupation with some later Babylonian graves. It is considered the type site for the Samarran culture.

== History ==
The inhabitants of Tell es-Sawwan were farmers who used irrigation from the Tigris to support their crops, as rainfall was unreliable. They used stone and flint tools similar to those of the Hassuna culture. Their prosperity, probably based on the dependability of irrigated crops, is evidenced by the presence of fine Samarran ware and beautiful, translucent marble vessels.

Underfloor graves of adults and children contained terracotta and alabaster statuettes of women and men, in various poses; some of these had the eyes and pointed heads typical of the Ubaid period.

== Archaeology ==
Tell es-Sawwan is an oval mound 350 metres (1,150 ft) long by 150 metres (490 ft) wide with a maximum height of 3.5 metres (11 ft). It consists of three tells, labeled A, B, and C aligned from north to south. Some of the western portion of the site has been lost to river erosion. The main mound was surrounded by a three-meter defensive ditch and a strong mudbrick wall. The Neolithic village, on mounds B and C, consisted of large mudbrick houses and other buildings thought to be granaries. There were five occupation layers. Among the finds were 77 Neolithic clay tokens. A number of clay sling bullets were also found, by a ditch and wall the excavators termed defensive in nature. The ditch was radiocarbon dated to 5730 ± 75 B.C.

Tell es-Sawwan was first noted by Ernst Herzfeld in 1930 while working at Samarra. The site was excavated by a team from the Iraqi Directorate General of Antiquities in seven seasons between 1964 and 1971. The first, third, and fourth seasons were directed by Behnam Abu Al-Soof, the second season by Khalid Ahmad Al-a'dami and the sixth and seventh season by Walid Yasin. Donny George Youkana worked briefly at the site in 1985. In 1988 and 1989 further excavations were conducted by C. Breniquet for the Delegation Archeologique Francaise en IraK.

== Gallery ==
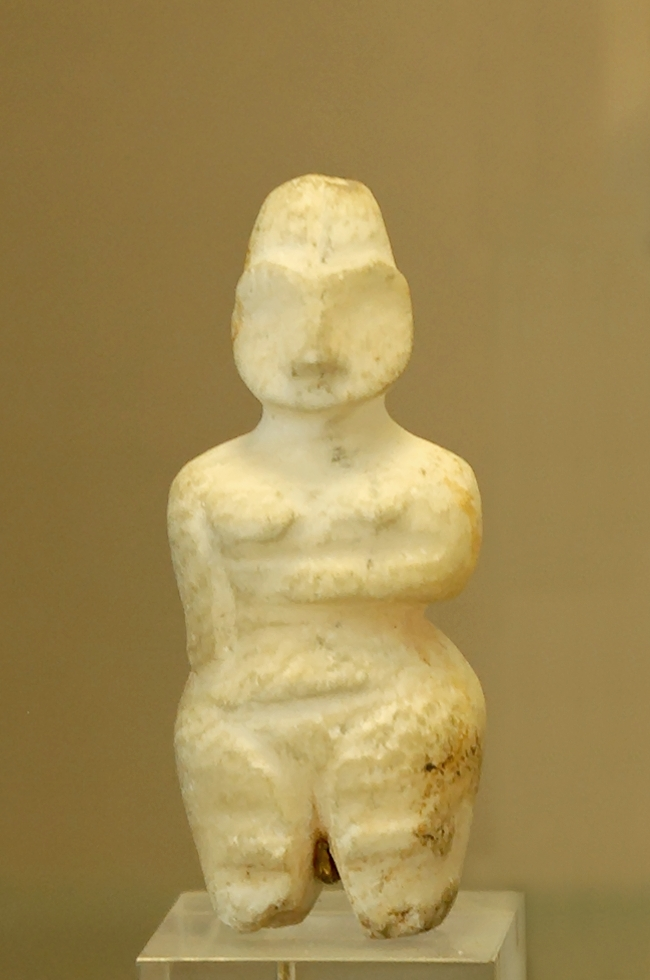
Female figurine from Tell es-Sawwan, Louvre Museum

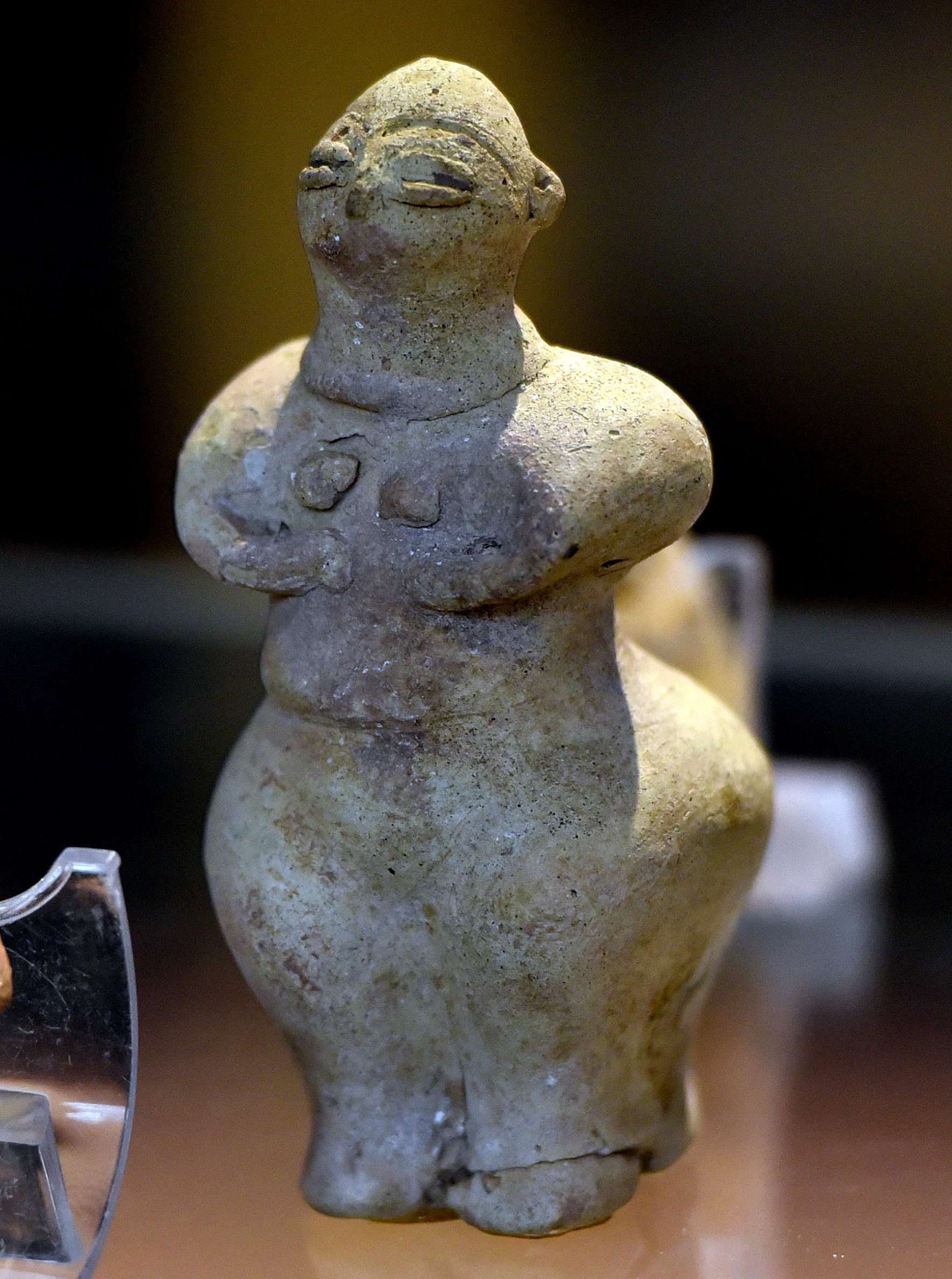
Mother goddess from Tell es-Sawwan, Iraq, 6000-5800 BCE. Iraq Museum

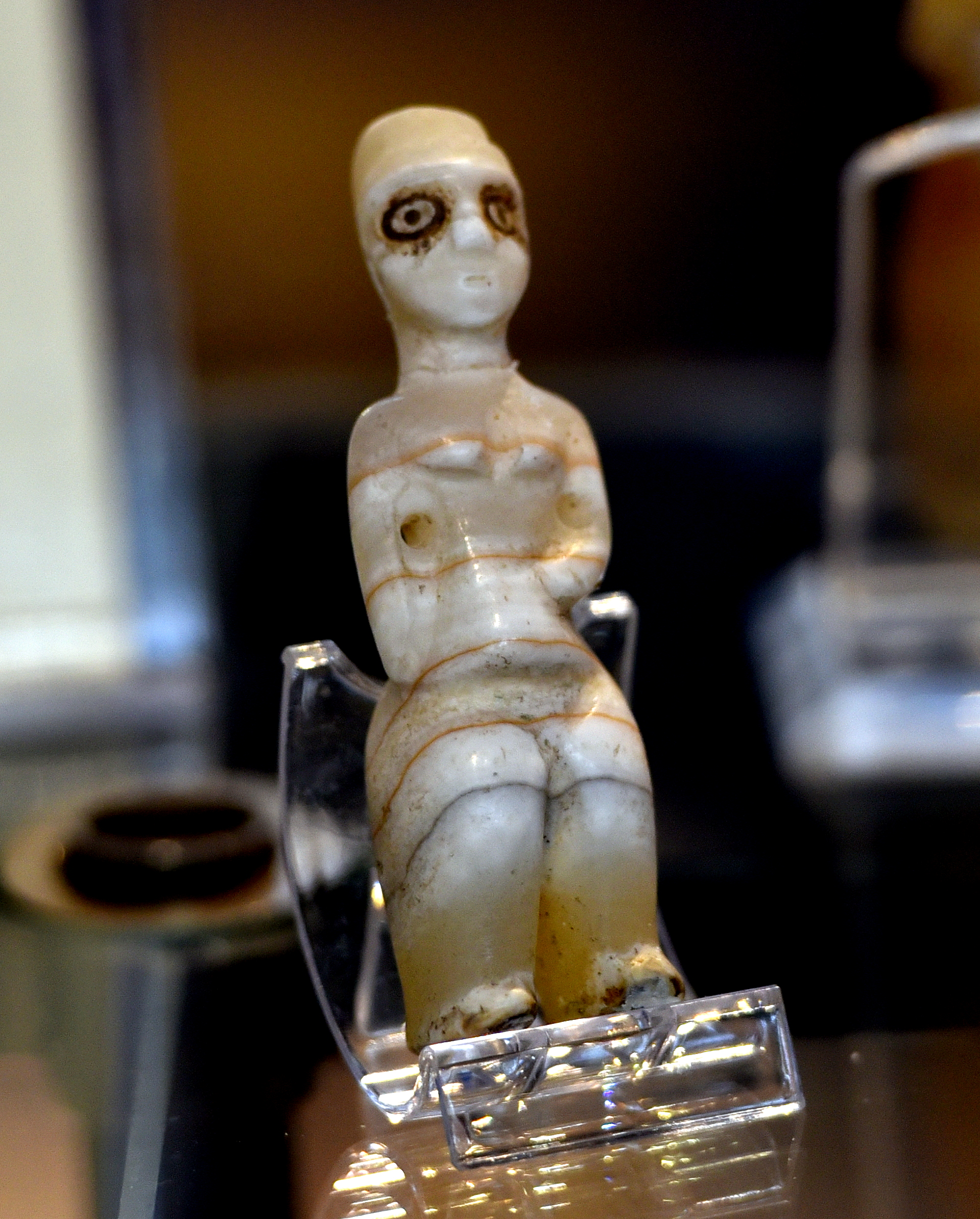
Mother goddess figurine from Tell es-Sawwan, Iraq, 6000-5800 BCE. Iraq Museum

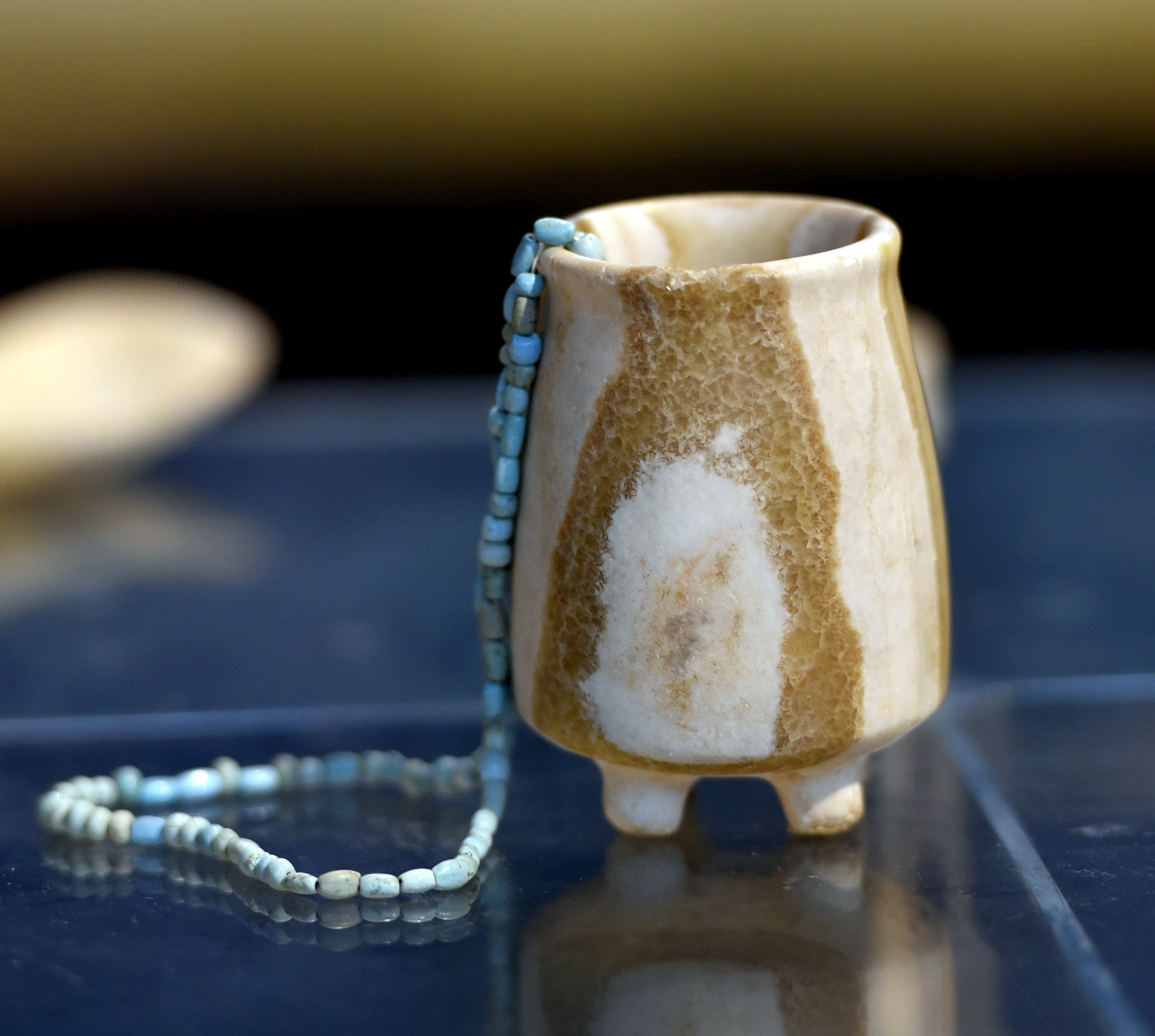
Alabaster jar with a necklace from Tell es-Sawwan, Iraq. 6000-5800 BCE. Iraq Museum

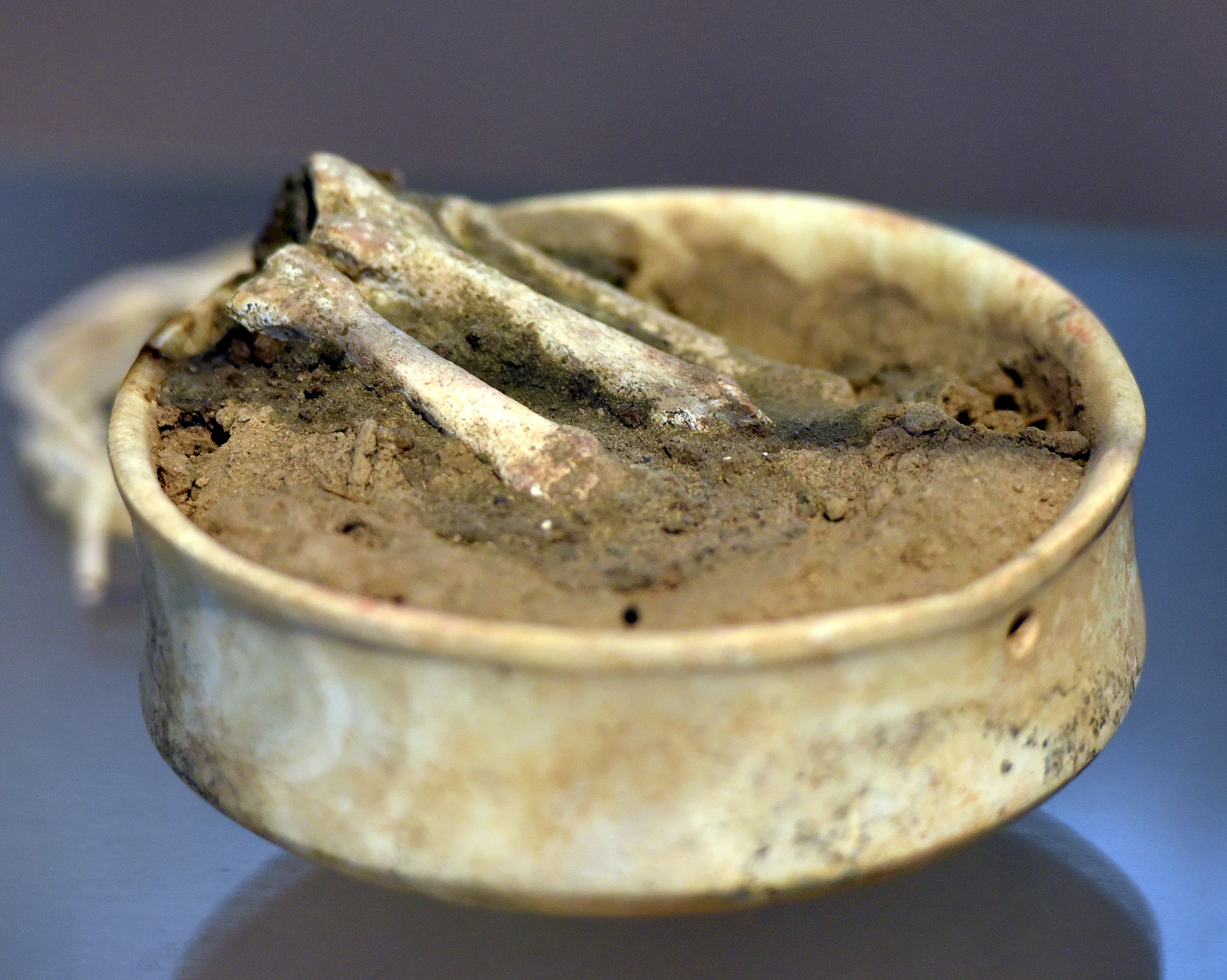
Bowl with human bones from Tell es-Sawwan, Iraq, 6000-5800 BCE. Iraq Museum

== See also ==
- Cities of the ancient Near East
