= Nassarius circumcinctus =

Scientific classification
- Kingdom: Animalia
- Phylum: Mollusca
- Class: Gastropoda
- Subclass: Caenogastropoda
- Order: Neogastropoda
- Family: Nassariidae
- Genus: Nassarius
- Species: N. circumcinctus

Binomial name
- Nassarius circumcinctus (Adams A., 1852)

Synonyms
- Nassa circumcincta A. Adams, 1852; Nassarius (Plicarcularia) circumcinctus (Adams, A., 1852); Naytiopsis granum flammulata Nordsieck, 1972

Species of gastropod

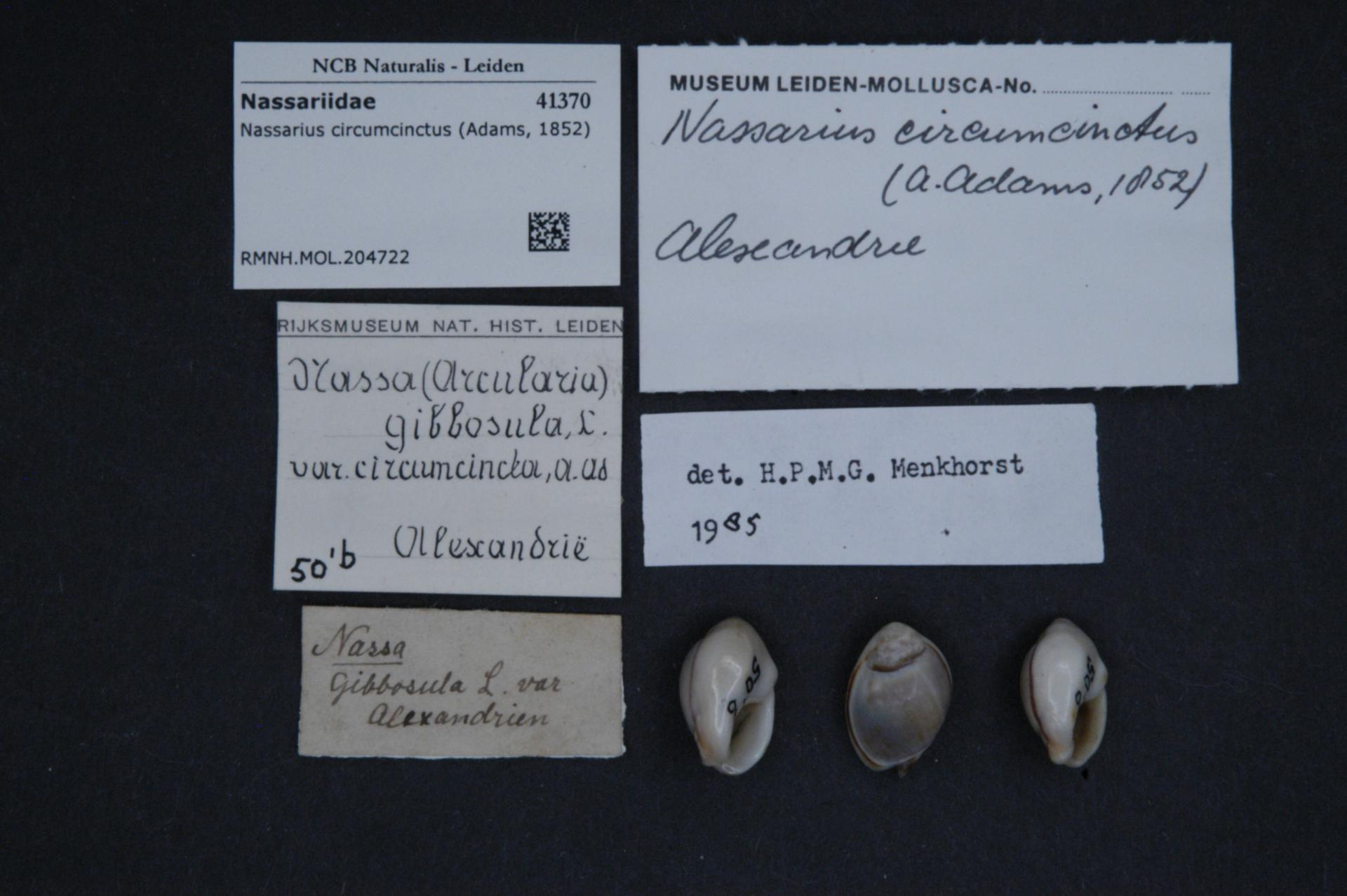
Nassarius circumcinctus (Adams, 1852)

Nassarius circumcinctus is a species of sea snail, a marine gastropod mollusc in the family Nassariidae, the Nassa mud snails or dog whelks.

== Description ==
The shell grows to a length of 15 mm.

== Distribution ==
This species occurs in the Mediterranean Sea.
