= Halaf culture =

Archaeological culture

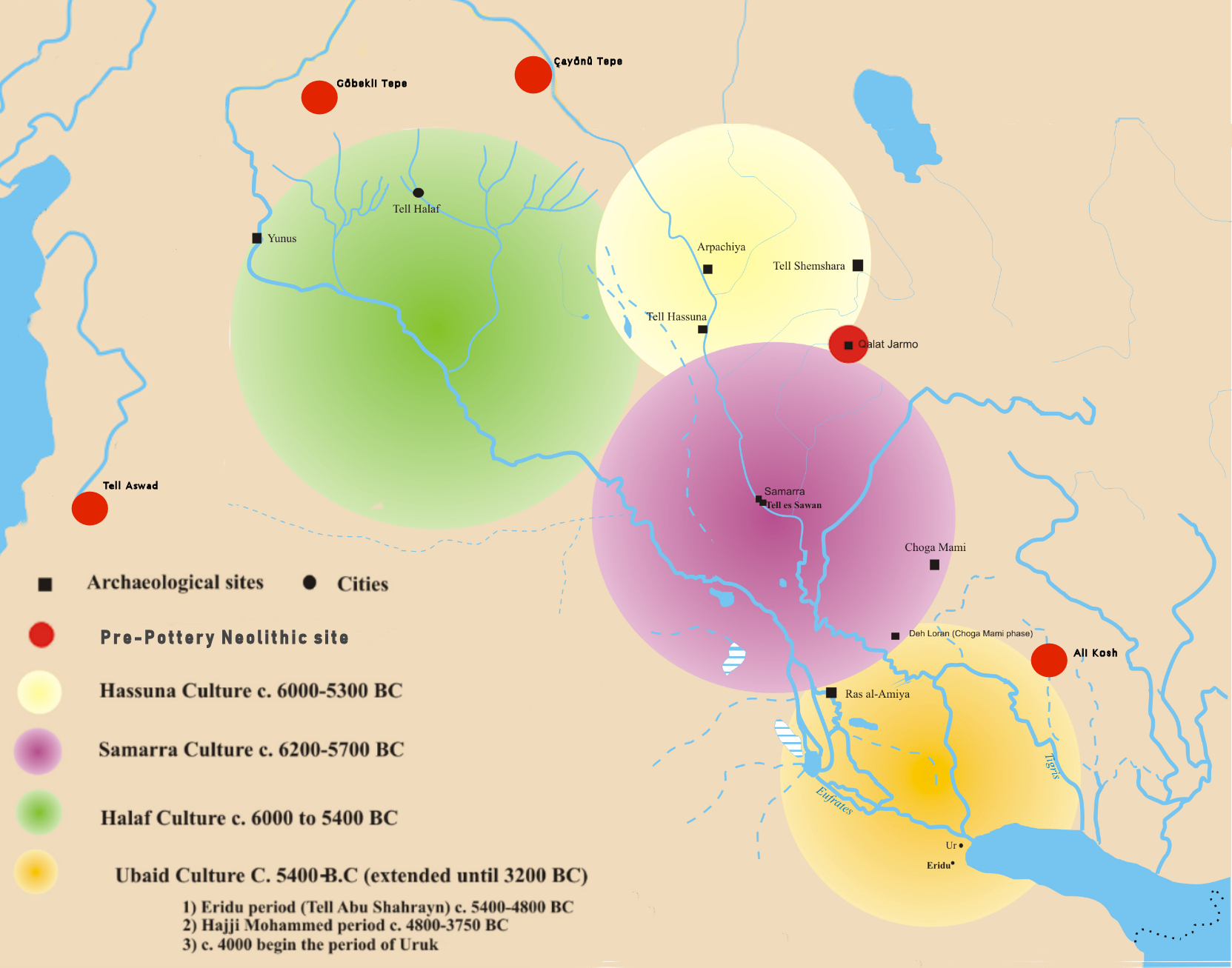
- Halaf culture (in green), next to Samarra, Hassuna and Ubaid cultures.
- Geographical range: Mesopotamia
- Period: Neolithic 3 – Pottery Neolithic (PN)
- Dates: c. 6,100–5,100 BC
- Type site: Tell Halaf
- Major sites: Tell Brak
- Preceded by: Pre-Pottery Neolithic B, Yarmukian culture
- Followed by: Halaf-Ubaid Transitional period, Hassuna culture, Samarra culture

Map of Iraq showing important sites that were occupied during the Halaf culture (clickable map)

The Halaf culture is a prehistoric period which lasted between about 6100 BC and 5100 BC. The period is a continuous development out of the earlier Pottery Neolithic and is located primarily in the fertile valley of the Khabur River (Nahr al-Khabur), of south-eastern Turkey, Syria, and northern Iraq, although Halaf-influenced material is found throughout Greater Mesopotamia.

While the period is named after the site of Tell Halaf in north Syria, excavated by Max von Oppenheim between 1911 and 1927, the earliest Halaf period material was excavated by John Garstang in 1908 at the site of Sakce Gözü. Small amounts of Halaf material were also excavated in 1913 by Leonard Woolley at Carchemish, on the Turkish/Syrian border. However, the most important site for the Halaf tradition was the site of Tell Arpachiyah, now located in the suburbs of Mosul, Iraq.

The Halaf period was succeeded by the Halaf-Ubaid Transitional period, which comprised the late Halaf (c. 5400–5000 BC), and then by the Ubaid period.

== Origin ==
Previously, the Syrian plains were not considered as the homeland of Halaf culture, and the Halafians were seen either as hill people who descended from the nearby mountains of southeastern Anatolia, or herdsmen from northern Iraq. However, those views changed with the recent archaeology conducted since 1986 by Peter Akkermans, which have produced new insights and perspectives about the rise of Halaf culture. A formerly unknown transitional culture between the pre-Halaf Neolithic's era and Halaf's era was uncovered in the Balikh valley, at Tell Sabi Abyad (the Mound of the White Boy).

Currently, eleven occupational layers have been unearthed in Sabi Abyad. Levels from 11 to 7 are considered pre-Halaf; from 6 to 4, transitional; and from 3 to 1, early Halaf. No hiatus in occupation is observed except between levels 11 and 10. The new archaeology demonstrated that Halaf culture was not sudden and was not the result of foreign people, but rather a continuous process of indigenous cultural changes in northern Syria that spread to the other regions.

== Culture ==
=== Halaf pottery ===
Halaf pottery has been found in other parts of northern Mesopotamia, such as at Nineveh and Tepe Gawra, Chagar Bazar, Tell Amarna and at many sites in Anatolia (Turkey) suggesting that it was widely used in the region.

Painted pottery from the Halaf culture contains the earliest systematic depictions of vegetal motifs in Near Eastern prehistoric art. Categorized primarily into flowers, shrubs, branches, and trees, these plant designs account for approximately 15% of decorated sherds across surveyed sites, with local frequencies varying, such as 4–6% at Tell Halula.

Floral patterns are the most common motif. Many show precise radial symmetry dividing space into geometric sequences of 4, 8, 16, and 32 petals, with certain vessels featuring complex grid layouts containing dozens of repeating floral elements. Archaeologists Yosef Garfinkel and Sarah Krulwich argue that this systematic doubling reflects early ethnomathematical understanding—skills also seen in contemporary geometric stamp seals—which likely supported daily tasks in early agrarian communities, such as dividing goods or sharing crops. Because specific domestic food crops are not illustrated, these patterns are generally interpreted as aesthetic choices rather than direct representations of agricultural activities.

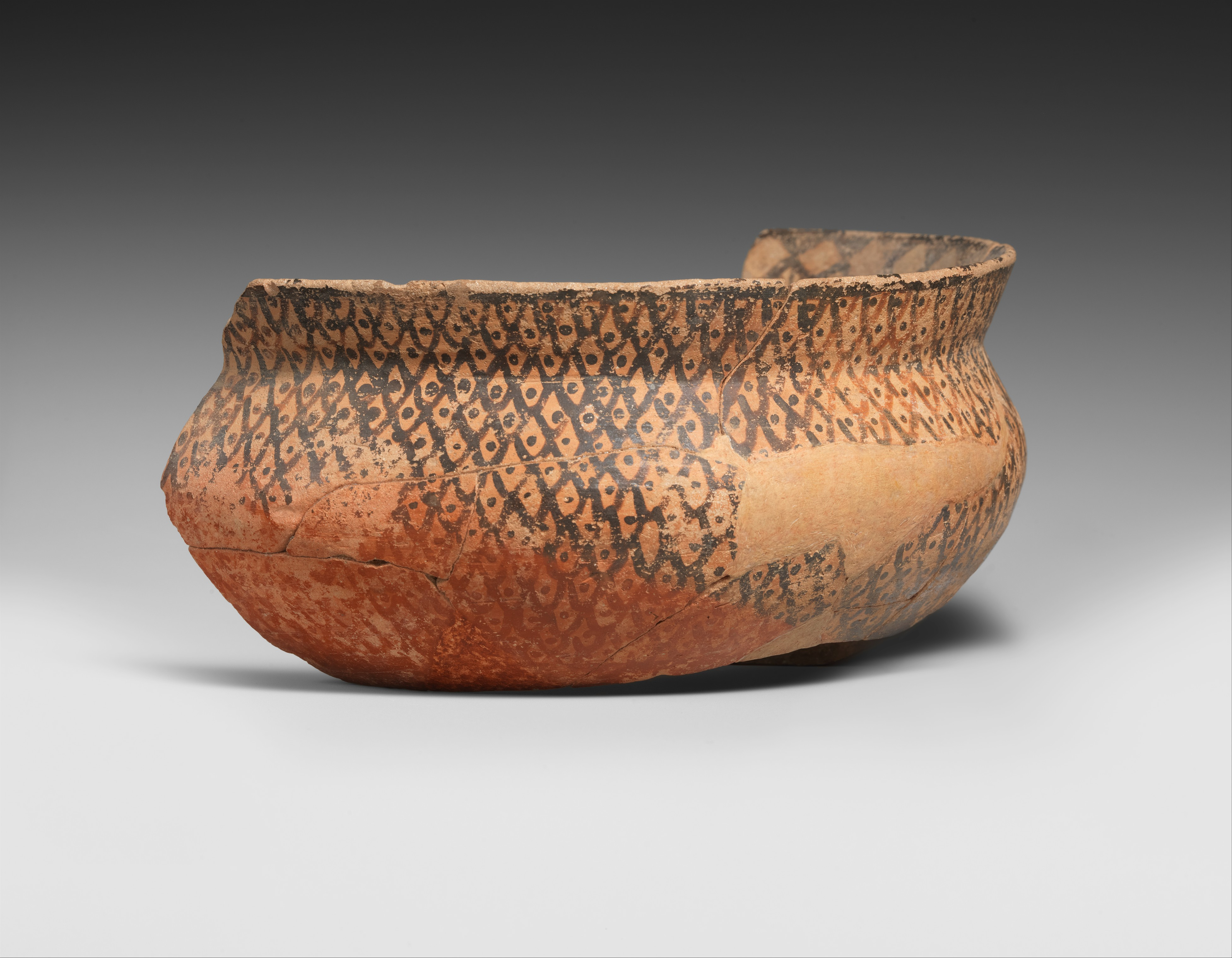
Fragment of a bowl; 5600–5000 BC; ceramic; 8.2 cm; Metropolitan Museum of Art (New York City)

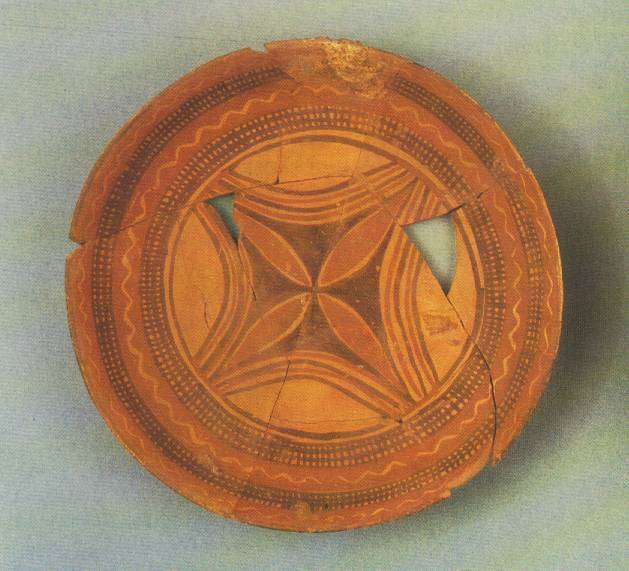
Halafian ware

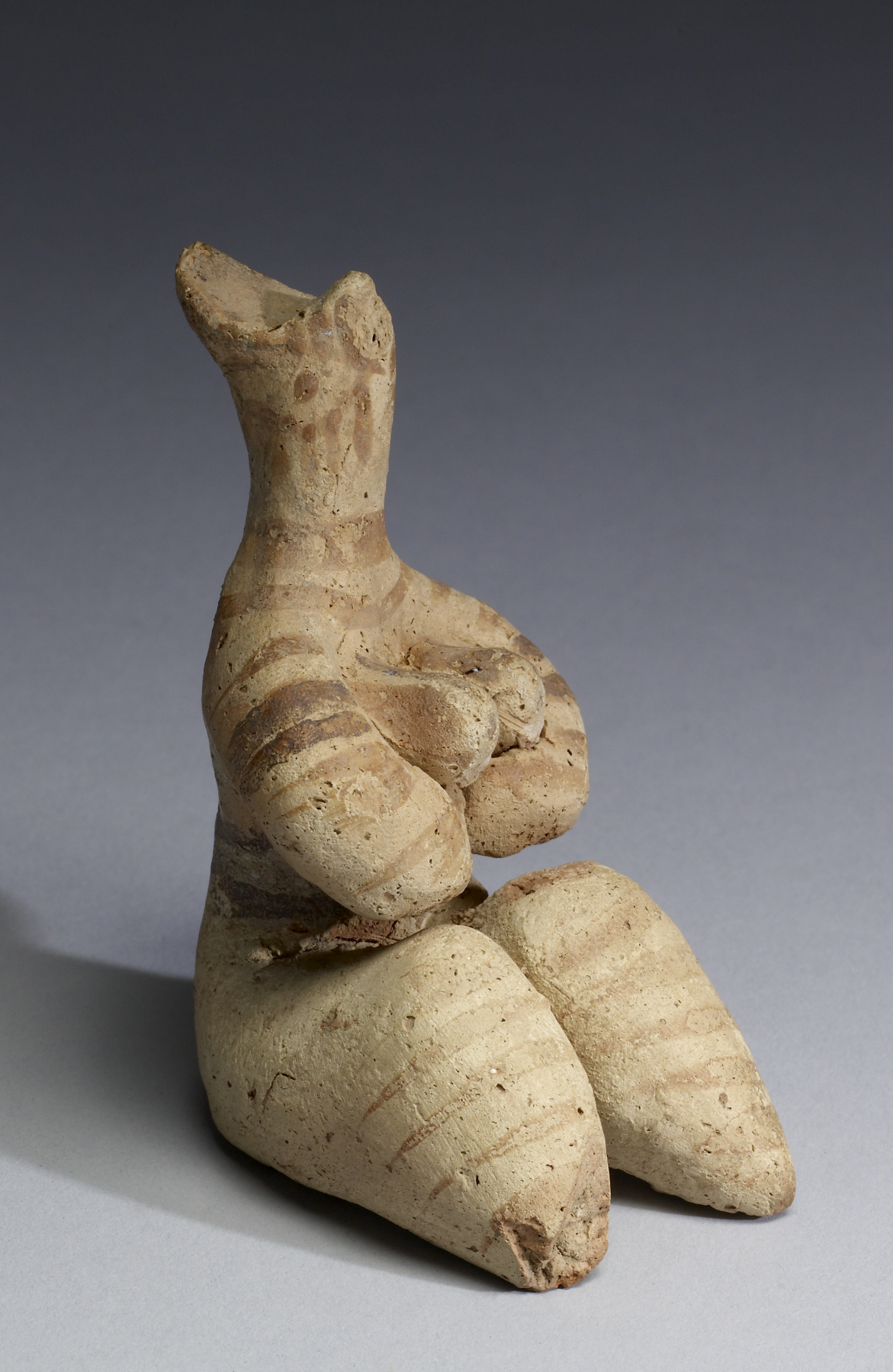
Fertility figurine (maybe a goddess?); 5000–4000 BC; terracotta with traces of pigment; 8.1 × 5 × 5.4 cm; by Halaf culture; Walters Art Museum (Baltimore, US)

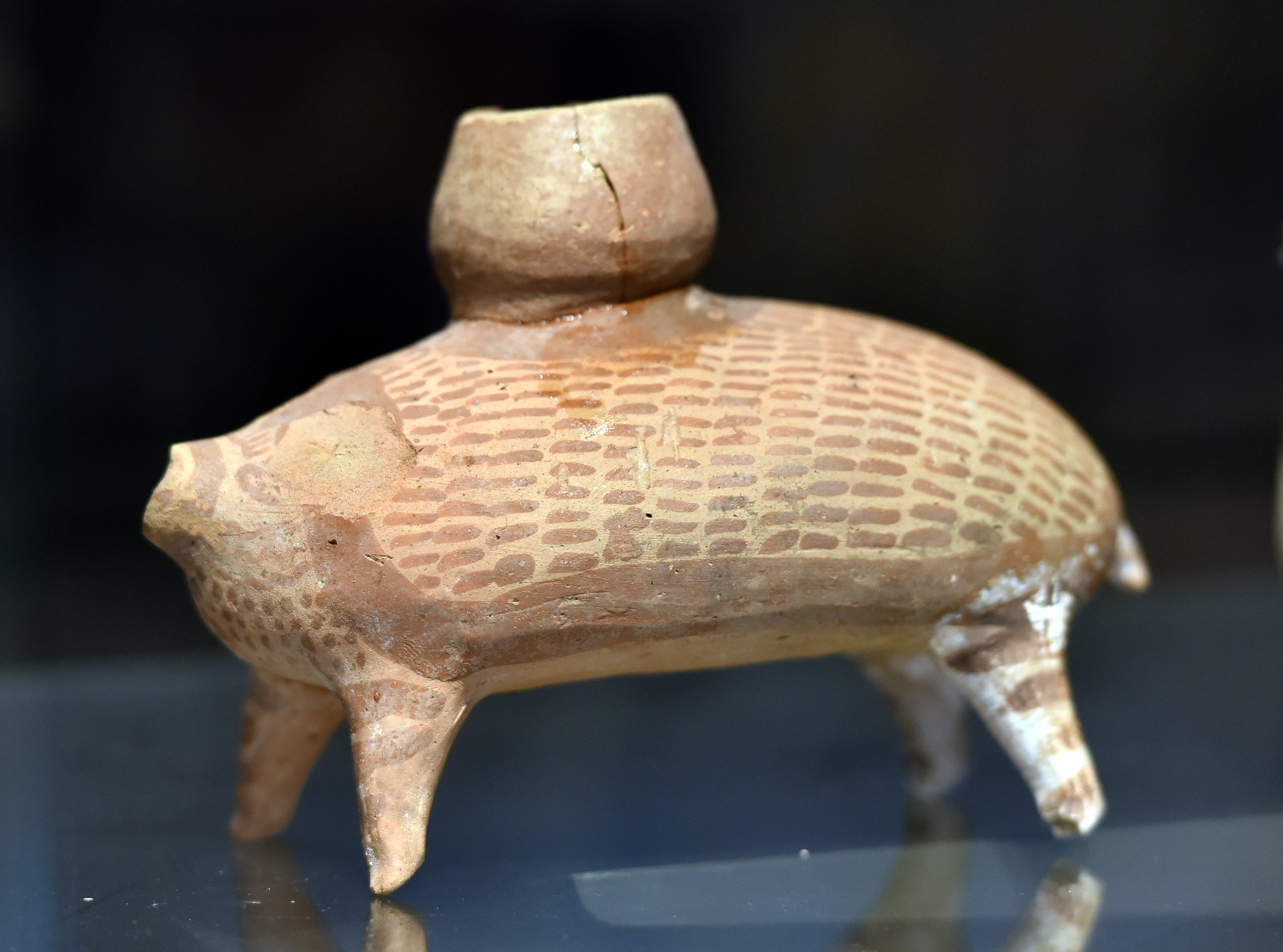
A zoomorphic porcupine vase; c. 5000 BC; from Tell Arpachiyah; Iraq Museum, (Baghdad)

=== Stamp seals ===
The Halaf culture saw the earliest known appearance of stamp seals in the Near East. They featured essentially geometric patterns.

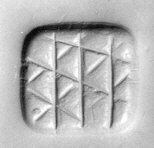
Loop-handled rectangular seal, Halaf culture.

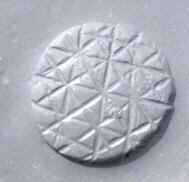
Loop-handled circular seal.

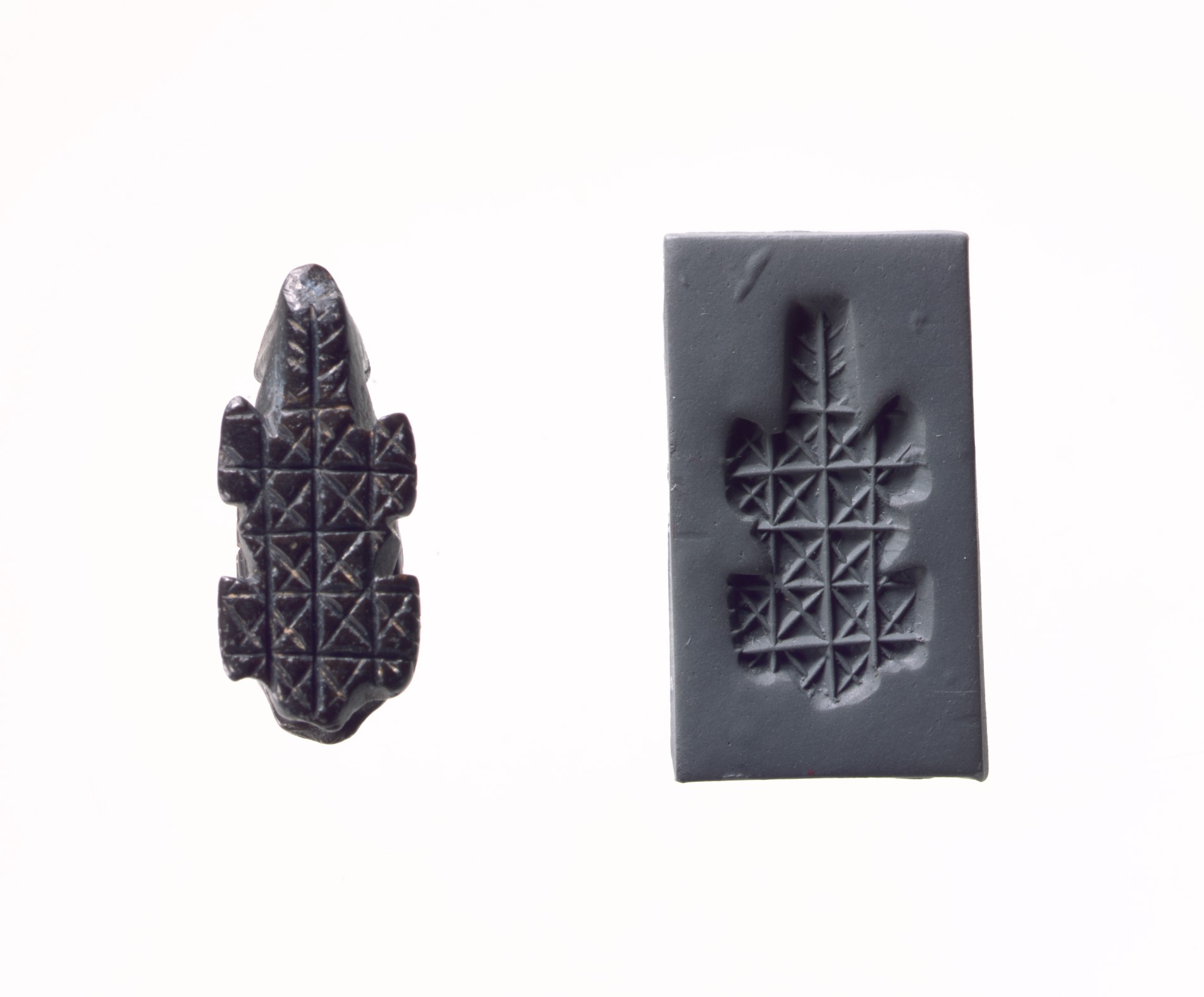
Stamp seal and modern impression – geometric pattern. Halaf culture

== Halaf's end (Northern Ubaid) ==
Halaf culture ended by 5000 BC after entering the so-called Halaf-Ubaid Transitional period. Many Halafian settlements were abandoned, and the remaining ones showed Ubaidian characters. The new period is named Northern Ubaid to distinguish it from the proper Ubaid in southern Mesopotamia, and two explanations were presented for the transformation. The first maintains an invasion and a replacement of the Halafians by the Ubaidians; however, there is no hiatus between the Halaf and northern Ubaid which exclude the invasion theory. The most plausible theory is a Halafian adoption of the Ubaid culture, which is supported by most scholars, including Oates, Breniquet, and Akkermans.

== See also ==
- Samarra culture
- Hassuna culture
- Ubaid culture
