= Tell Arpachiyah =

Neolithic site in Iraq

- Tepe Reshwa
- Location within Iraq
- 36°22′17″N 43°11′52″E
- Type: settlement
- Periods: Halaf, Ubaid
- Location: Nineveh Governorate, Iraq
- Region: Northern Mesopotamia

History
- Built: 6th Millennium BC

Site notes
- Excavation dates: 1933, 1976
- Archaeologists: M. Mallowan, J. Cruikshank Rose, I. Hijara

Tell Arpachiyah (also Tall Arpachiyah) is a prehistoric ancient Near East archaeological site just outside modern Mosul in Nineveh Governorate (Iraq). It takes its name from a more recent village located about 4 miles (6.4 km) from Nineveh. The local name of the mound on which the site is located is Tepe Reshwa.

Tepe Gawra is also a contemporary Neolithic site located in the Mosul region.

== Archaeology ==
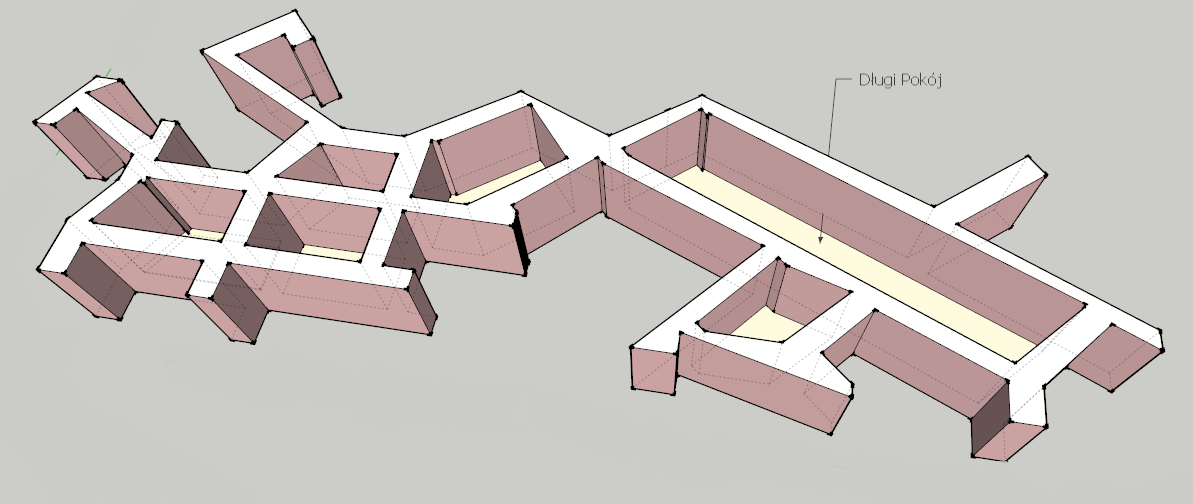
Burnt House in Tell Arpachiyah (Halaf culture) 3D reconstruction

Tell Arpachiyah is a small tell, or settlement mound, with a maximum diameter of 67 metres (220 ft) and a peak height of 5.5 metres (18 ft). The full site has a diameter of around 125 metres (410 ft). After being scouted by Reginald Campbell Thompson in 1928, it was excavated by Max Mallowan and John Cruikshank Rose of the British School of Archaeology in Iraq, along with Agatha Christie, for 6 weeks in 1933. 180 workers with only two supervisors were employed and records of plans and find spots are not complete. A cemetery was excavated with grave goods being only utilitarian pottery vessels. Four tholoi were found in the outlying area of the site. Finds were divided between the British Museum and Iraq.

Additional soundings were conducted in 1976 by a team led by Ismail Hijara worked for 8 weeks. A single 57.5 meter long and 2,5 meter wide double-L-shaped trench was excavated. In 7.5 meters of Halaf period (the 1933 excavation had only dug to 1.5 meters) dug remains 11 building phases were found. No Ubaid period remains were found leading to the assumption that those 5 layers had been completely removed in the 1933 excavation. Two graves were excavated where skulls have been placed in bowls. Several Halaf structures were uncovered, including tholoi and the "Burnt House". An array of Halaf pottery and sealings were also found, along with an Ubaid cemetery containing 50 graves. Two 5th millennium BCsmall cone counting tokens were found. A faience seal, glazed steatite and faience beads, and Halaf period human painted figurines were also found. A Halaf period vase, from Grave 2 and repaired with gypsum in antiquity, depicted an archer with a mace carrying a quiver and hunting a crouched lioness on the interior. The exterior of the vase hold 5 scene panels.

=== The Burnt House ===
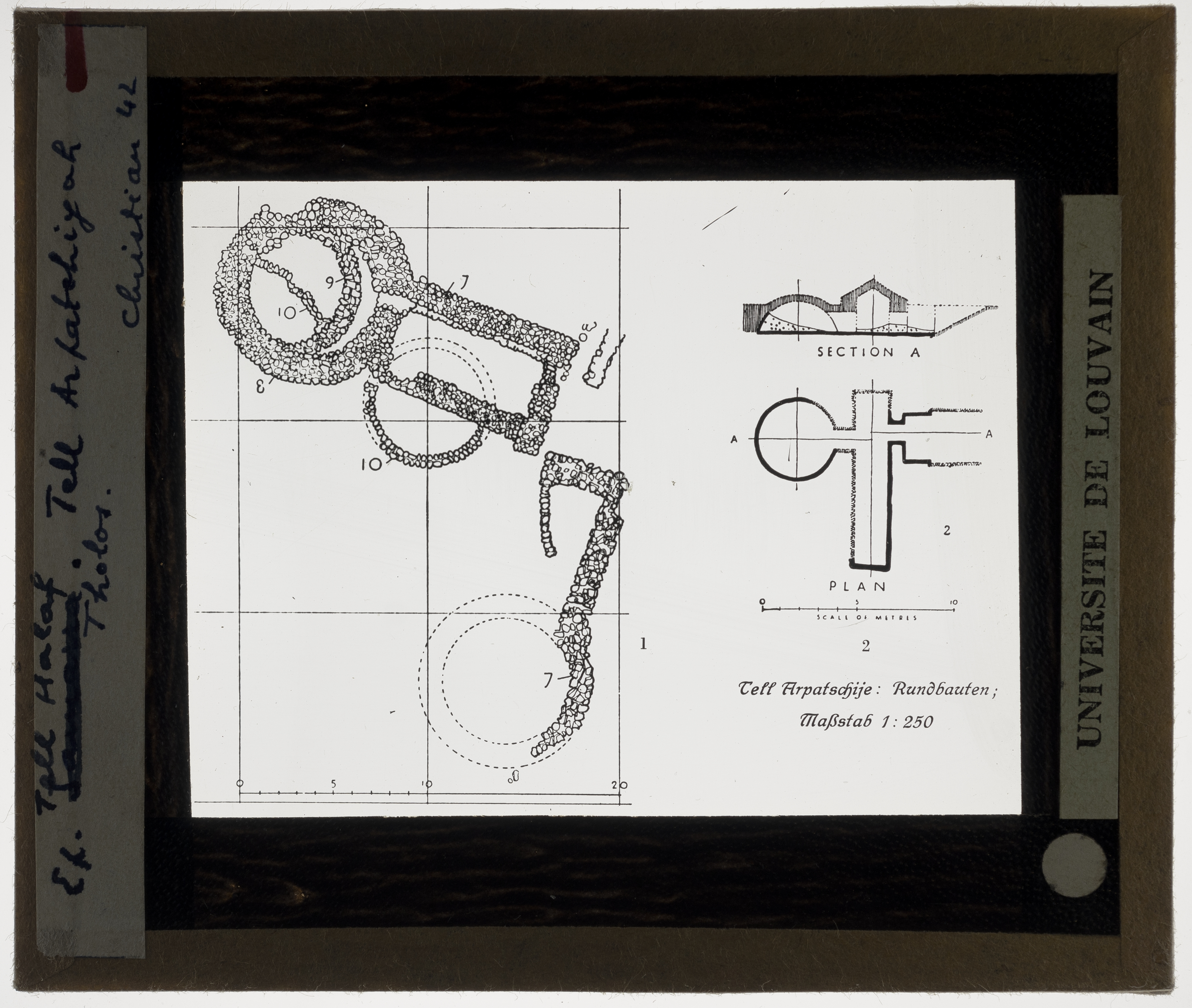
Tholos building at Tell Arpachiyah

This building (layer TT6), also called the Burnt Building, was excavated in 1933, found in the final, most recent, Halaf period level. It had been destroyed by fire. The Burnt House was constructed over two early levels of large circular (called Tholos by the excavator) structure with long rectangular antechambers attached to them. The earlier structure was constructed in layer TT8 with 10 meter external diameter and 1 meter wide walls built on a foundation of river boulders. It was rebuilt on the same plan in layer TT7. The excavator described it as a potter's workshop and stone-worker's workshop but a "chiefly dwelling" has also been proposed. The original excavator ascribed the destruction of the Burnt House to invaders, possible from the Ubaid culture (the destruction was later determined to be not dated to the end of the Halaf period). A later view is that the building was ritually "closed" with the abandonment of the site. Forty one clay sealings, made by 26 stamp seals, were found in the building as well as 35 stamp seals.

== Occupation history ==
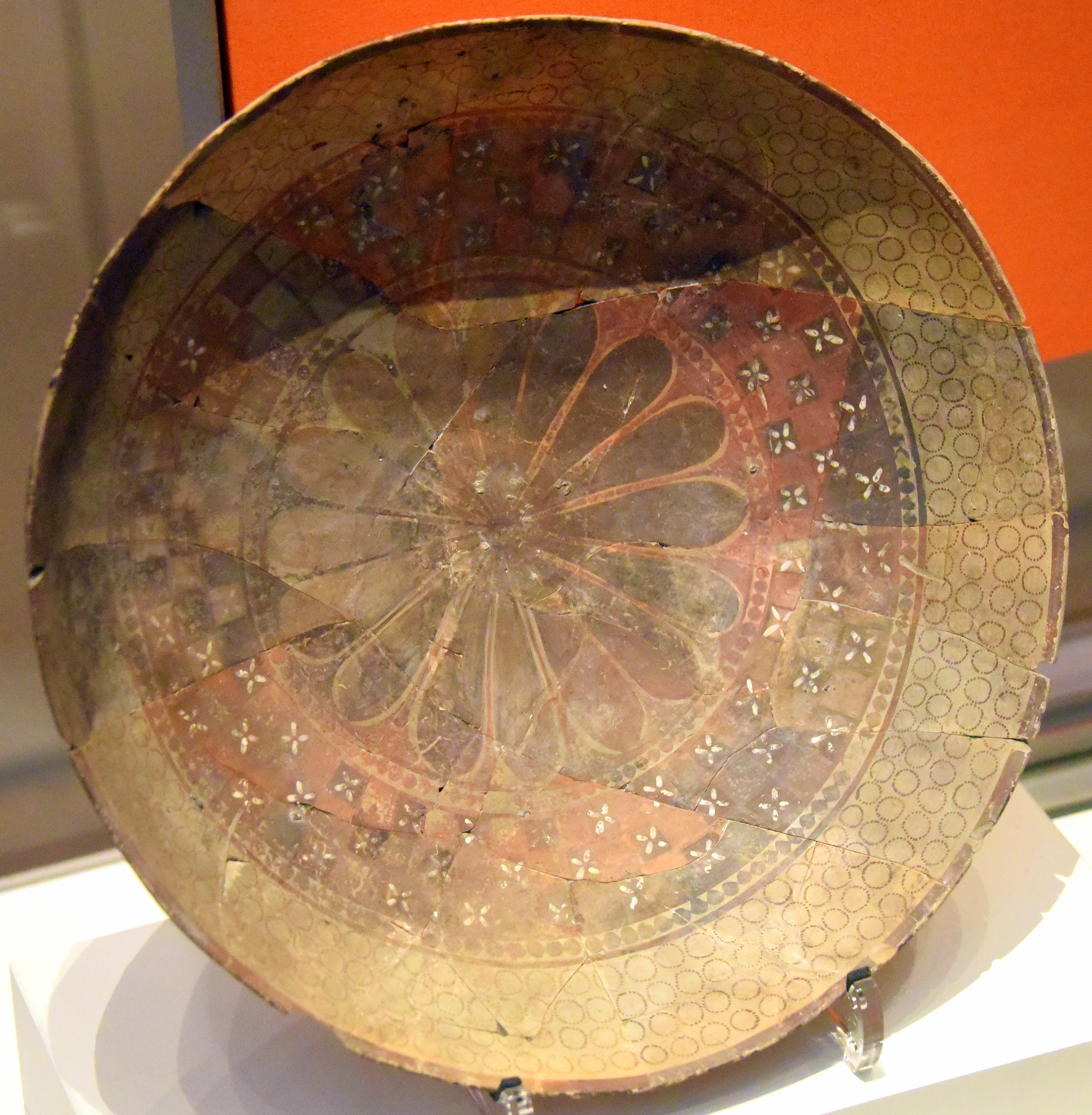
Bowl from Tell Aprachiyah. Bowl fragmented and pieces were scattered before building was burned.

The site had significant occupation in the Late Halaf period and, after a hiatus, by a small Ubaid period village. It appears to have been heavily involved in the manufacture of pottery. The pottery recovered there forms the basis for the internal chronology of the Halaf period. The periodization of the site (TT = Top of Tepe):

- TT1-4 - Ubaid period pottery
- TT5 - mixed Ubaid and Halaf pottery with no transition sequence
- TT 6 = Halaf pottery - Burnt House
- TT 7 = Halaf pottery - rebuild of central tholos
- TT 8 = Halaf pottery - Initial construction of central tholos
- TT 9-10 = Halaf pottery

== Gallery ==
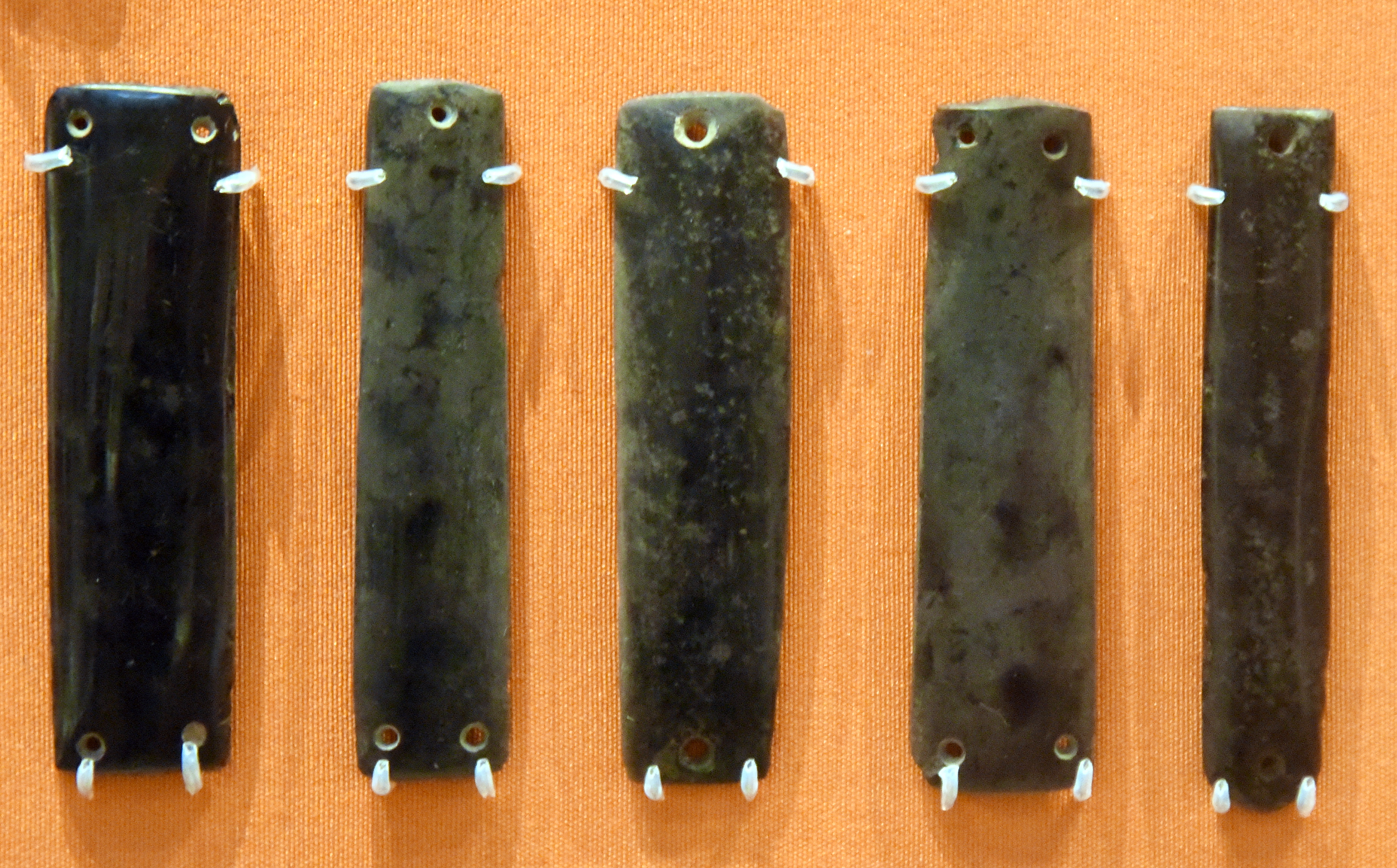
Obsidian jewelry. It is unknown whether they were sewn to clothing or they were joined to make a necklace, bangle, or belt. 6000-5000 BC

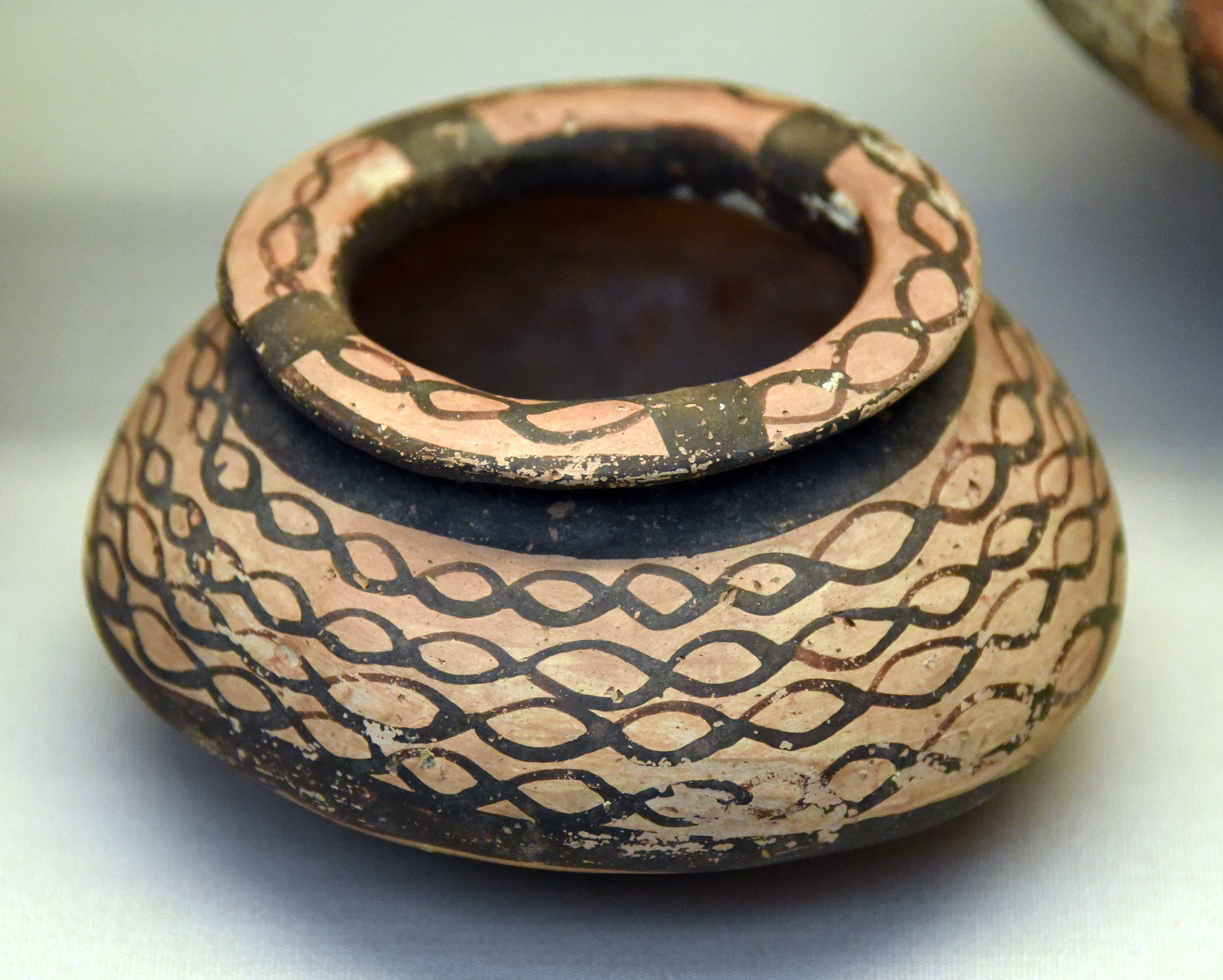
Jar. The surface is painted with lustrous black paint on a salmon-pink slip. Halaf period, 6000-5000 BC

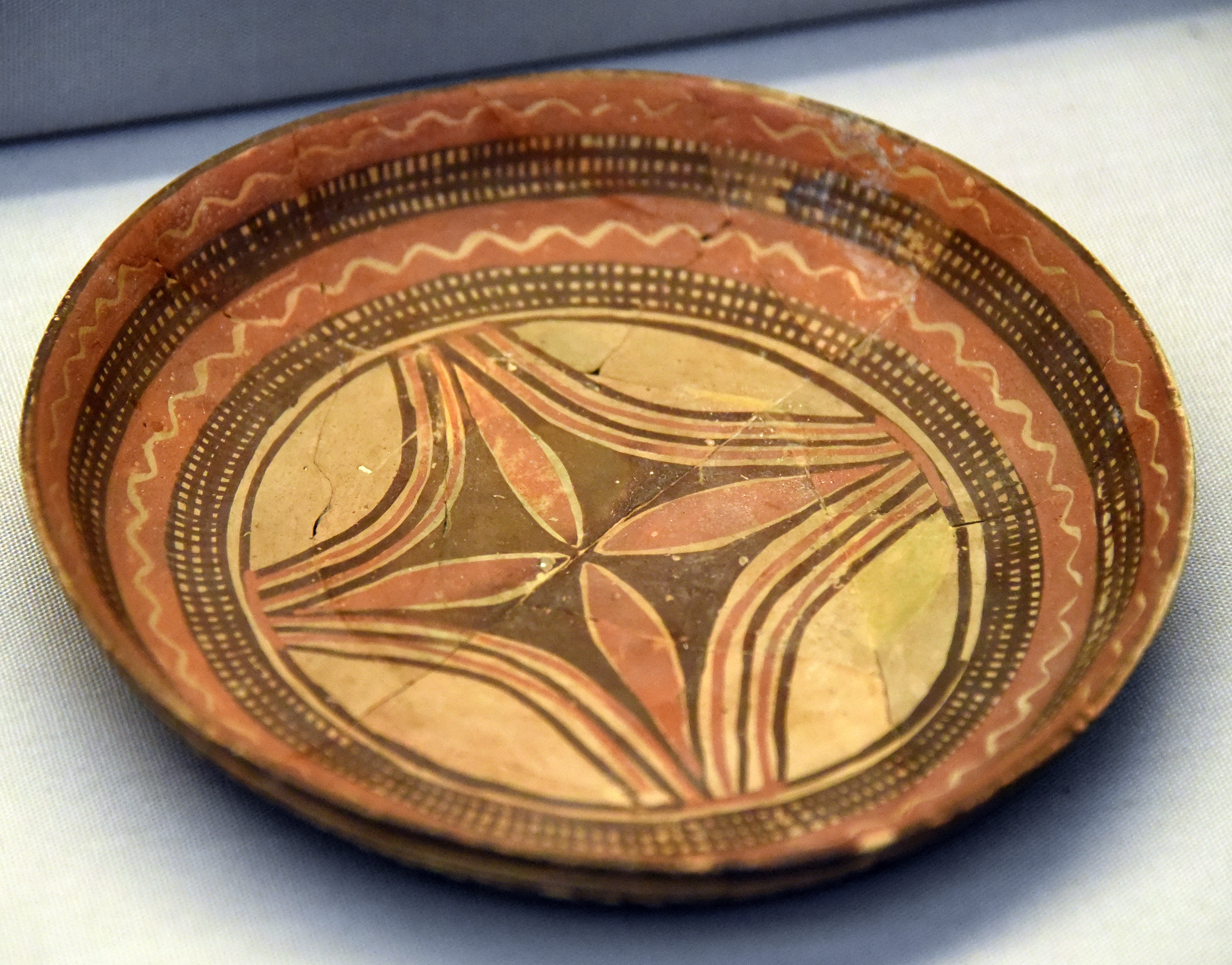
Shallow plate. The interior is decorated with a floral design in the center, with polychrome in black and red on the buff surfaces. 6000-5000 BC

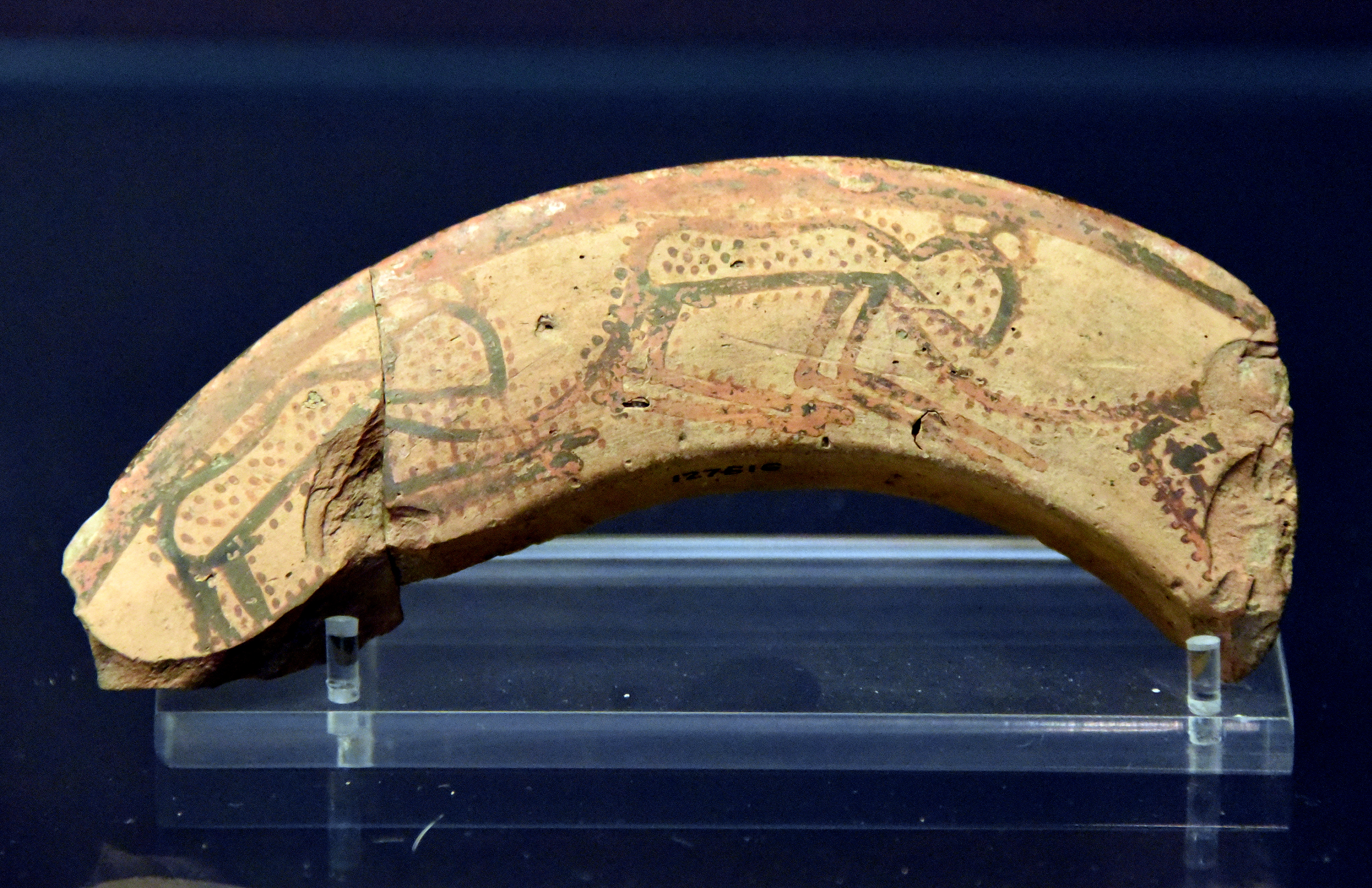
Sherd. The exterior is painted with a design; lustrous black paint on apricot-coloured clay with a burnished surface. The design of spotted animals possibly represents leopards

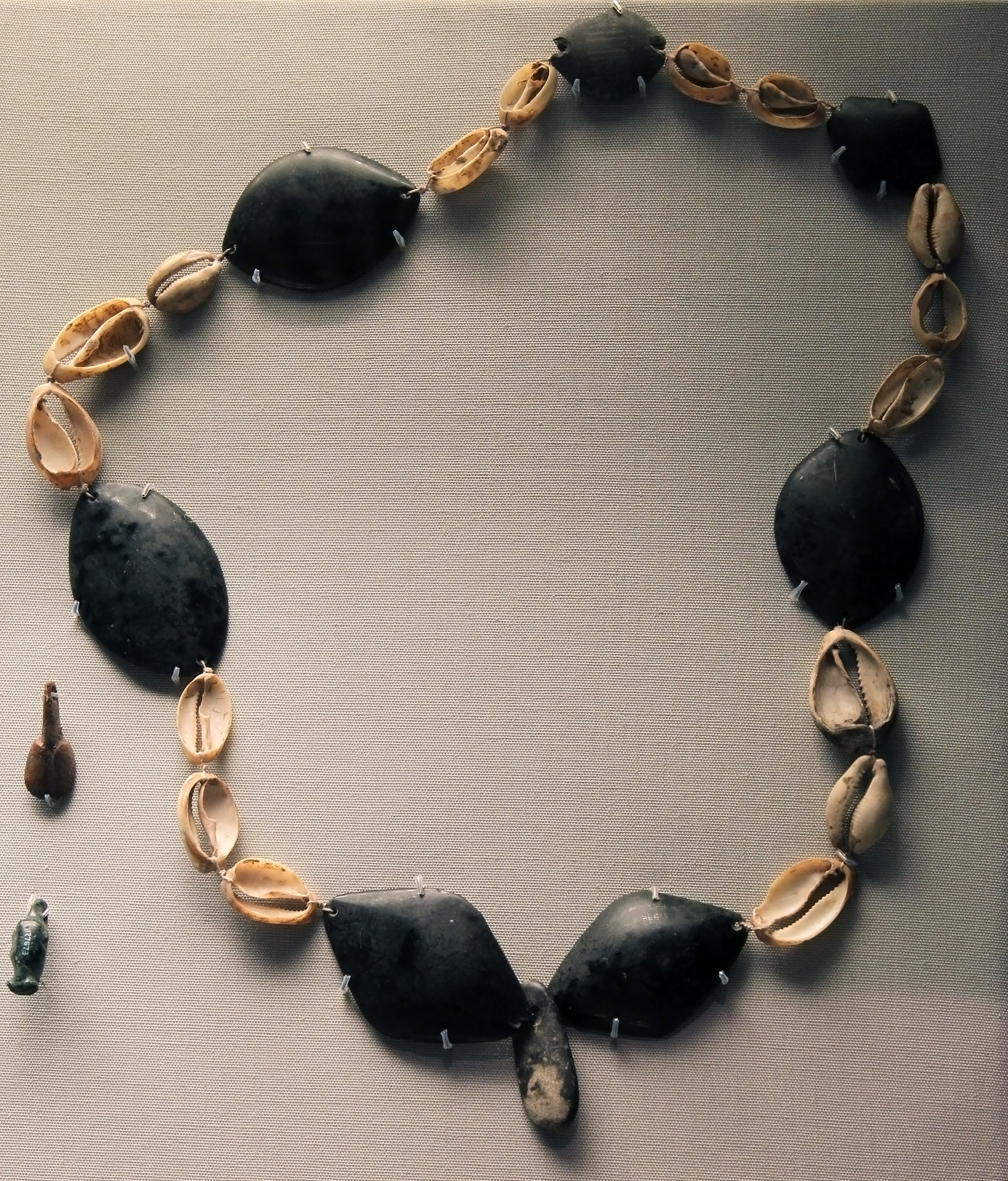
Necklace Obsidian beads and cowrie shells Halaf period found in Burnt House at Tell Arpachiyah

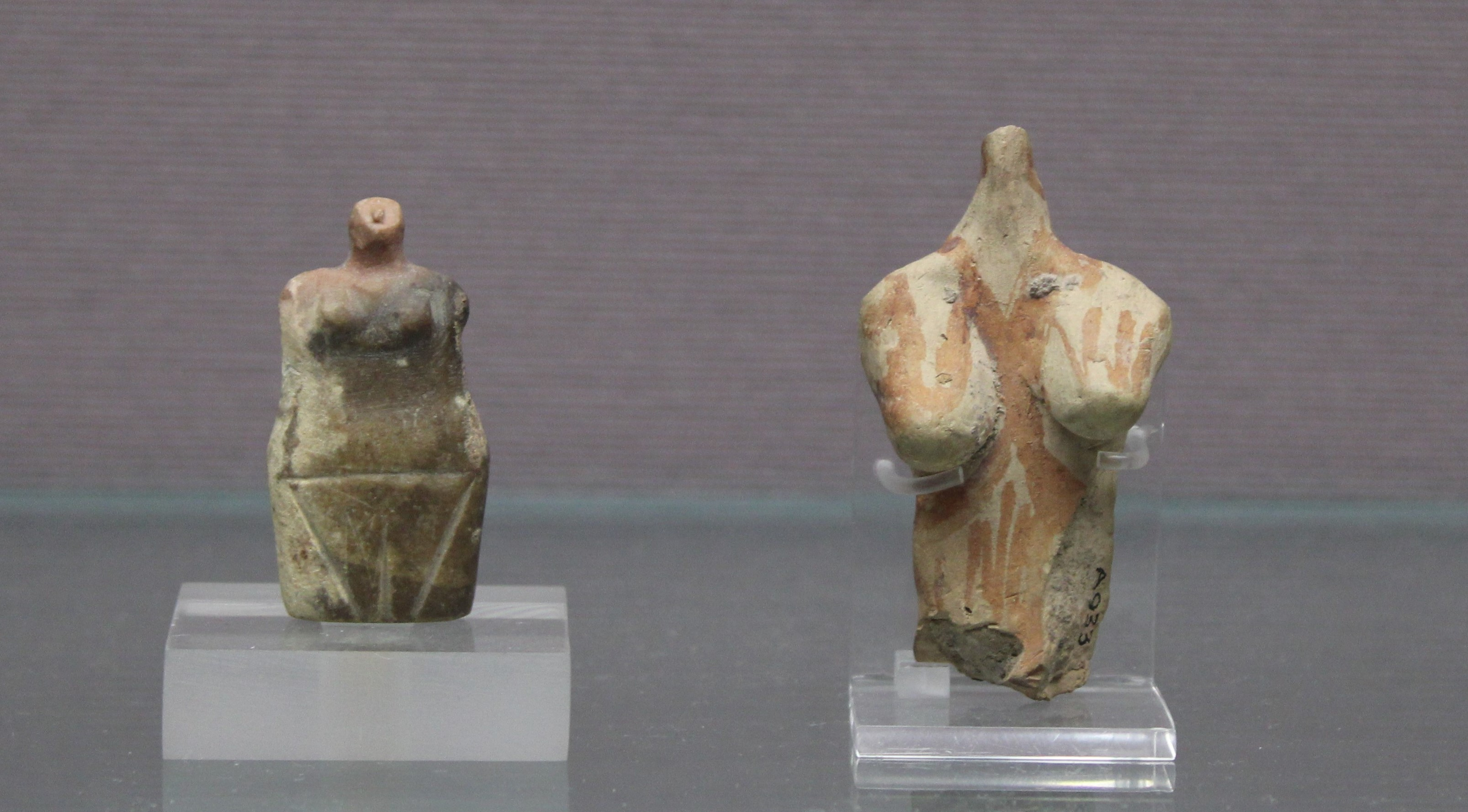
Two female figurines from the Halaf culture, late period (c. 5600-5200 BC), from Tell Arpachiyah

== See also ==
- Cities of the ancient Near East
- Come, Tell Me How You Live
- Early and simple domes
