= Hadji Muhammad =

Hadji Muhammad can refer to:

- Hadji Muhammed, The archaeological type site for the Middle Ubaid period (4800–4500 BC).
- A spelling of Piri Reis's birth name (ca. 1465 –1555).
- Hadji Muhammad a Pasha-Dey of Algiers (1815).
