= Hadji Muhammed =

Hajji Muhammad
- Hadji Muhammed, Haggi Muhammad
- Location within Iraq Location within Near East
- 31°19′28″N 45°38′11″E
- Type: archaeological site, tell, type site
- Periods: Ubaid period
- Location: Al Muthanna Governorate, Iraq
- Region: Lower Mesopotamia

Site notes
- Excavation dates: 1937–1939

Hadji Muhammed (also Hajji Muhammad and Qalat Hajji Muhammad and Haggi Muhammad) is an archaeological site in Southern Iraq which gives its name to a style of painted pottery and the early phase of what is the Ubaid culture. The pottery is painted in dark brown, black or purple in an attractive geometric style. Sandwiched between the earliest settlement of Eridu and the later "classical" Ubaid style, the culture is found as far north as Ras Al-Amiya. The Hadji Muhammed period saw the development of extensive canal networks from major settlements. Irrigation agriculture, which seems to have developed first at Choga Mami (4700–4600 BC) and rapidly spread elsewhere, from the first required collective effort and centralised coordination of labour. Buildings were of wattle and daub or mud brick. Joan Oates has suggested on the basis of continuity in configurations of certain vessels, despite differences in thickness of others that it is just a difference in style, rather than a new cultural tradition
