= Tell Mashnaqa =

- تل مشنقة (Arabic)
- Location within Syria
- 36.288425°N 40.79464°E
- Type: settlement
- Periods: Pottery Neolithic, Ubaid period, Uruk, Early Bronze Age
- Location: 30 km south of Al-Hasakah, Syria
- Region: Khabur River region

History
- Built: ca. 5200
- Abandoned: ca. 2000 BC

Site notes
- Material: mudbrick
- Height: 4–11 m
- Area: 4 hectares (0.015 mi^{2})
- Excavation dates: 1990—1995
- Condition: ruins
- Owner: Public

Tell Mashnaqa (Arabic: تل مشنقة) is an archaeological site from the Ubaid period (ca. 5200–4900 BC) located on the Khabur River, a tributary to the Euphrates, about 30 kilometres (19 mi) south of Al-Hasakah in northeastern Syria. It was excavated by a Danish team from 1990–1995.

== Overview ==
Houses were found at the earliest level of the tell. Model ships have been unearthed.
