= Ubaid period =

Prehistoric period of Mesopotamia

- A clickable map of Iraq detailing important sites that were occupied during the Ubaid period
- Geographical range: Near East
- Period: Chalcolithic
- Dates: c. 6500 – c. 3800 BC
- Type site: Tell al-'Ubaid
- Major sites: Tell el-'Oueili; Tell Abu Shahrain (Eridu); Hadji Muhammed; Choga Mami; Tell Abada; Tepe Gawra
- Preceded by: Pottery Neolithic; Samarra culture; Hassuna culture; Halaf culture; Halaf-Ubaid Transitional period
- Followed by: Uruk period

The Ubaid period (c. 6500–3800 BC) is a prehistoric period of Mesopotamia. The name derives from Tell al-'Ubaid where the earliest large excavation of Ubaid period material was conducted initially by Henry Hall in 1919, Leonard Woolley in 1922–1923, and later by Pinhas Delougaz in 1937. Excavations continue to the present day.

In Southern Mesopotamia, this period marks the earliest known settlements on the alluvial plain, although evidence of earlier habitation has likely been obscured under the alluvium. In the south the Ubaid period spans from about 5500 to 3800 BC, when it is succeeded by the Uruk period.

In Northern Mesopotamia the period runs only from about 5300 to 4300 BC. It is preceded by the Halaf period and the Halaf-Ubaid Transitional period, and succeeded by the Late Chalcolithic period.

== History of research ==
The excavators of Eridu and Tell al-'Ubaid found Ubaid pottery for the first time in the 1910–1920s. In 1930, the attendees at a conference in Baghdad defined the concept of an "Ubaid pottery style". The characteristic pottery of this style was a black-on-buff painted ware. This conference also defined the Eridu and Hajji Muhammed styles. Scholars at this conference mistakenly thought that these pottery styles were so different that "[...] they could not have developed out of the old, as is the case with the Uruk ware after the al-'Ubaid ware [...]". For many attendants of the conference, "this sequence based largely on pottery represented a series of different 'ethnic elements' in the occupation of southern Mesopotamia." These ideas about the nature of the Ubaid style phenomenon did not last. The term "Ubaid" is still used, but its meaning has changed over time.

Joan Oates demonstrated in 1960 that the Eridu and Hajji Muhammed styles were not distinct at all. Instead, they were part of the greater Ubaid phenomenon. She proposed a chronological framework that divides the Ubaid period in four phases. Other scholars later proposed two more phases, zero and five.

Scholars in the 1930s only knew a few Ubaid sites. These included the type site of Tell al-'Ubaid, Ur, and in the north, Tepe Gawra. Since then, archaeologists have discovered Ubaid material culture throughout the ancient Near East. There are now Ubaid sites in the Amuq Valley in the northwest and all the way to the Persian Gulf coast in the southeast. Important research includes the many excavations in the Hamrin area in the 1970s. There, archaeologists found a complete Ubaid settlement at Tell Abada, and a very well-preserved house at Tell Madhur. The excavation at Tell el-'Oueili in the 1980s revealed occupation layers that were older than those from Eridu. This discovery pushed back the date for the earliest human occupation of Lower Mesopotamia.

Excavations along southern coast of the Persian Gulf provided a great deal of evidence for contacts with Mesopotamia. The site of H3 in Kuwait, for example, provided the earliest evidence in the world for seafaring. The explosion of archaeological research in Iraqi Kurdistan since the 2010s also led to discovery of even more new data on the Ubaid. For example, this research demonstrated that cultural links between the Shahrizor Plain and the Hamrin area farther south were stronger than those with the north.

== Climate and environment ==
Mesopotamia lacks local, high-resolution climate proxy records such as those found at the Soreq Cave in Israel, making it difficult to reconstruct the region's past climate. Even so, it is known that the environment during the sixth and fifth millennium BC differed from today's. A more temperate climate settled in around 10,000 BC. Marshy and riverine areas transformed into floodplains, and eventually river banks with trees. The area south of Baghdad may have been habitable by humans in the eleventh millennium BC, but current evidence places the earliest settlements south of Uruk during the eighth millennium BC, though previous scholarship had believed it to be much later.

Archaeobotanical research in the Ubaid 0 levels at 'Oueili (6500-6000 BC) has indicated the presence of Euphrates poplar and sea clubrush, both indicating a wetland environment. Changes in sea-level shaped the shoreline of the Persian Gulf: at the beginning of the Ubaid, around 6500 BC, the shoreline at Kuwait may have run slightly farther south. During the subsequent 2.5 millennia, the shoreline moved farther northward, up to the ancient city of Ur around 4000 BC.

Date palms were present in southern Mesopotamia since at least the eleventh millennium BC, predating the earliest evidence for domesticated dates from Eridu by several millennia. Date palms require a perennial water source, again indicating that this period may have been wetter than today. Similarly, oak was present from the eighth millennium, but disappeared at around the same time that Ubaid material culture spread outward from southern Mesopotamia during the sixth millennium BC. It has been suggested that acquisition of high-quality wood may have played a role in this expansion.

The available evidence in northern Mesopotamia points to a cooler and drier climate during the Hassuna and Halaf periods. From the Halaf-Ubaid Transitional (HUT) to early Uruk periods, this developed into a climate characterised by stronger seasonal variation, heavy torrential rains, and dry summers.

== Dating and geographical distribution ==
Ubaid and Ubaid-like material culture has been discovered over an immense area. Ubaid ceramics have been found from Mersin in the west to Tepe Ghabristan in the east, and from Norşuntepe and Arslantepe in the north to Dosariyah in the south along the Gulf coast of Saudi Arabia. In this area, researchers have discerned considerable regional variation, indicating that the Ubaid was not a monolithic culture through time and space.

Currently, the Ubaid period is most commonly divided in six phases, called Ubaid 0–5, with the oldest known site in southern Mesopotamia (Tell el-'Oueili) dating to Ubaid 0. Some of these phases denote pottery styles previously considered distinct from Ubaid, but which are now considered to be part of the same culture. Some of these styles, such as those found at the type site of Hadji Muhammed (previously equated with Ubaid 2) are now known to occur also in Ubaid 3 contexts, thereby limiting their value as chronological markers. The relative chronology is based on the long stratigraphic sequences of sites such as Ur, Eridu, and Tepe Gawra. The absolute chronology is more difficult to establish, mainly due to a lack of abundant radiocarbon dates determined in southern Mesopotamia.

Relative Ubaid chronology
phase	alternative name	Northern Mesopotamia	date (BC) (after Pournelle 2003 / after Harris 2021)
Ubaid 0	Oueili phase	Early Pottery Neolithic	6500–5900 / 6800–6200
Ubaid 1	Eridu style	Halaf	5900–5200 / 6200–5500
Ubaid 2	Hadji Muhammad style	Halaf-Ubaid Transitional	5200–5100 / 5500–5200
Ubaid 3	Tell al-'Ubaid style	Northern Ubaid	5100–4900 / 5200–4600
Ubaid 4	Late Ubaid	Northern Ubaid	4900–4350 / 5200–4600
Ubaid 5	Terminal Ubaid	Late Chalcolithic 1	4350–4200 / 4600–4200

=== Southern Mesopotamia ===
Map of important Ubaid period sites in Iraq

In the south, corresponding to the area that would later be known as Sumer, the entire Ubaid period extends from ca. 6500 to 3800 BC. It is here that the oldest known Ubaid site, Tell el-'Oueili, was discovered. To date no archaeological site in southern Iraq has yielded remains more ancient than Ubaid, though they might exist buried deep under alluvial sediments. This was the case, for example, of the site of Hadji Muhammed, which was discovered only by accident.

=== Central and northern Mesopotamia ===
Map of important Ubaid period sites in northern Mesopotamia

In central and northern Iraq, the Ubaid culture was preceded by the Hassuna and Samarra cultures. The Ubaid may have developed out of the latter. In Northern Syria and southeastern Turkey, the Ubaid follows upon the Halaf period, and a relatively short Halaf-Ubaid Transitional period (HUT) dating to c. 5500-5200 BC has been proposed as well. HUT pottery assemblages displayed both typically Ubaid and Halaf characteristics. The relationships between these cultural periods is complex and not yet fully understood, including how and when the Ubaid began to appear in Northern Mesopotamia. To resolve these issues, modern scholarship tends to focus more on regional trajectories of change where different cultural elements from the Halaf, Samarra, or Ubaid – pottery, architecture, and so forth – could co-exist. This makes it increasingly difficult to define an occupation phase at a site as, for example, purely Ubaid or purely Halaf.

In Northern Mesopotamia, Ubaid characteristics only begin to appear in Ubaid 2-3, i.e. toward the end of the sixth millennium BC, so that the entire Ubaid period there would be much shorter. For Syria, a range of 5300–4300 BC has been suggested. However, some scholars have argued that the interaction between the originally southern Mesopotamian Ubaid and the north had begun during Ubaid 1–2.

=== Persian Gulf ===
Map of important Ubaid period sites along the Persian Gulf coast

Ubaid pottery began to appear along the Persian Gulf coast toward the end of the sixth millennium BC, reaching a peak around 5300 BC and continuing into the fifth millennium. Coastal sites where Ubaid pottery has been discovered include Bahra 1 and H3 in Kuwait, Dosariyah in Saudi Arabia, and Dalma Island in the United Arab Emirates. Ubaid pottery has also been found further inland along the central Gulf coast at sites such as Ain Qannas, suggesting that the pottery may have been a valuable trade item, rather than being a container for some other commodity. This suggestion is reinforced by locally-produced pottery imitating Ubaid wares found at Dosariyah. It is unclear which products were traded for the pottery. Suggestions include foodstuffs (dates), semi-precious materials, jewellery (made from pearl and shell), animal products, and livestock. Notably, the degree of cultural interaction between the Ubaid and local Neolithic communities is much stronger in the area of Kuwait than further south, up to the point that it has been suggested that Mesopotamians may have lived for part of the year at sites such as H3 and Bahra 1. Small objects such as labrets, tokens, clay nails, and small tools that may have had cosmetic use, and that are known from southern Mesopotamian sites also occur on sites along the Gulf coast, notably the sites in Kuwait.

Conversely, evidence exists for Arabian Neolithic material in Southern Mesopotamia. It has been noted that certain types of flint arrowheads found at Ur show clear resemblance with the Arabian Bifacial Tradition. Arabian Coarse Ware has been found at the sites of 'Oueili and Eridu. As at the sites in Kuwait, it may be possible that Arabian Neolithic groups also lived in Southern Mesopotamia.

== Material culture ==
=== Figurines ===
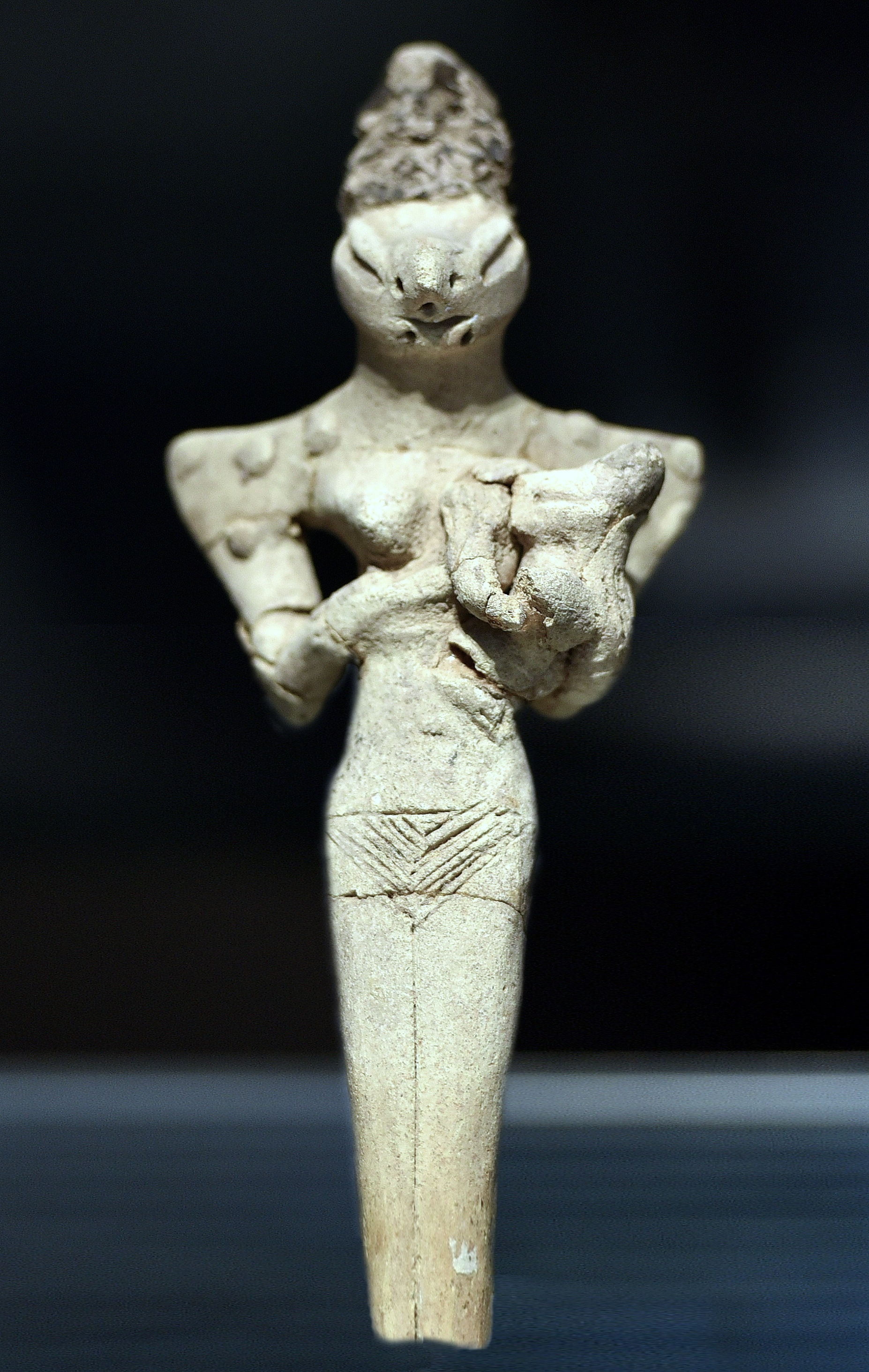
Late Ubaid; figurine of a lizard-headed nude woman nursing a child; terracotta and bitumen; c. 4000 BC; Iraq Museum

The majority of Ubaid figurines represented various animals, including sheep, cattle, and dogs. Human figurines were already present in previous periods. The majority of the human figures are female, but male and figurines without gender emphasis exist as well. Those from the early Ubaid reflect a continuation of earlier traditions. A single, painted figurine from the Ubaid 0 levels at Tell el-'Oueili has been interpreted as an early representation of the so-called "ophidian (snake-like) figurines", which became common in the later Ubaid. Both seating and standing figurines were made, with paint being used to detail body parts, clothing, or body modifications. "Ophidian figures" have been exclusively found at various southern Mesopotamian sites. They are characterised by a slender body, long, reptilian head with incised eyes and mouth and a threedimensional small nose. This particular rendering of the face may be a representation of a mask or possibly headshaping. The hands are placed before the abdomen, sometimes with incised fingers. The figurines are thought to be naked. Paint is sometimes used to indicate hair or other details.

In the earlier Ubaid, ophidian figures were only used in domestic contexts, whereas in Ubaid 3–4, they appear in graves as well, indicating a shift in how these figures were used. The rarity of ophidian figures as grave gifts may indicate differential treatment of the dead, possibly based on age, kinship, or social standing.

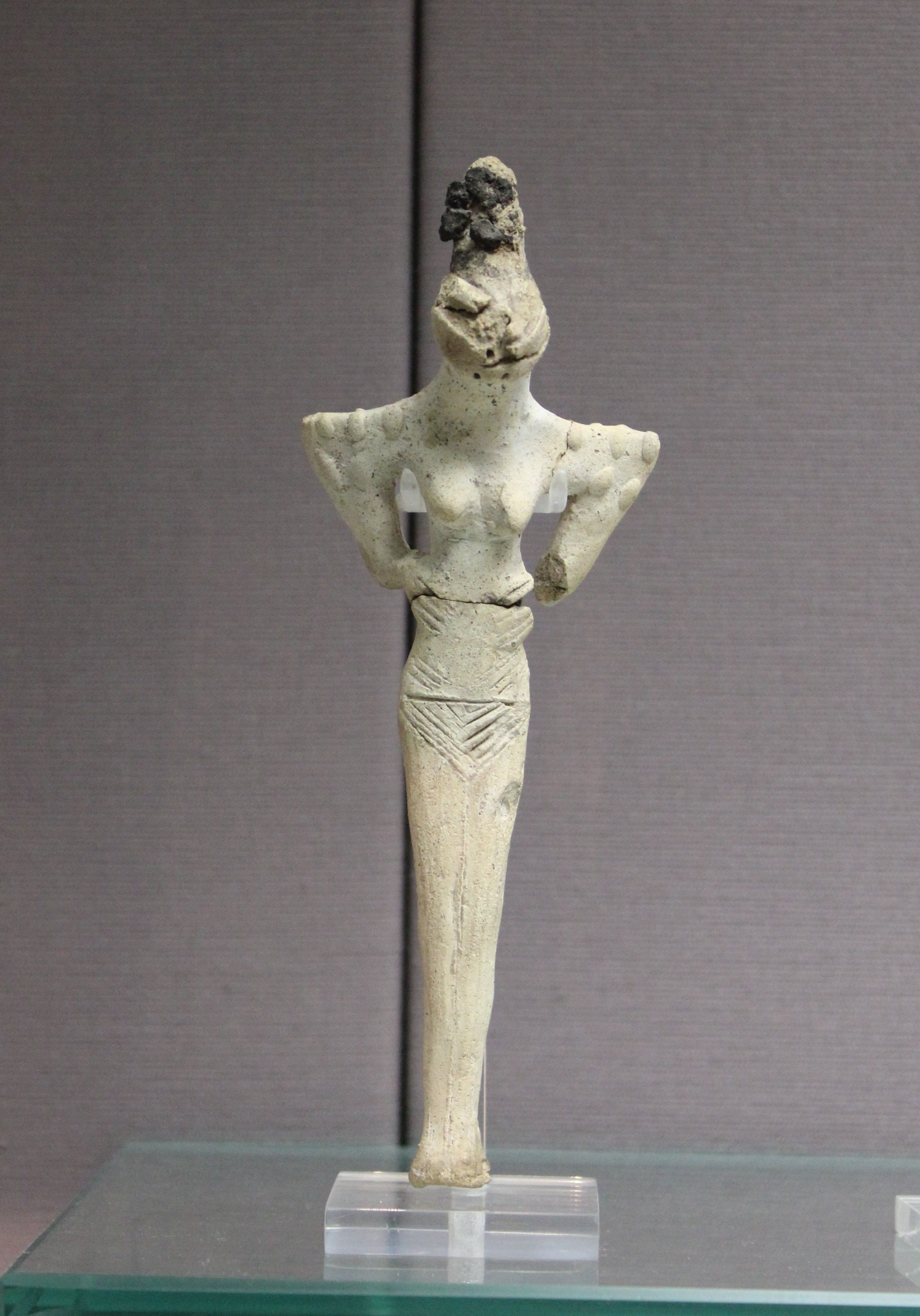
Figurine of a woman; clay; c. 5200 – c. 4200 BC; Tell el-Muqayyar

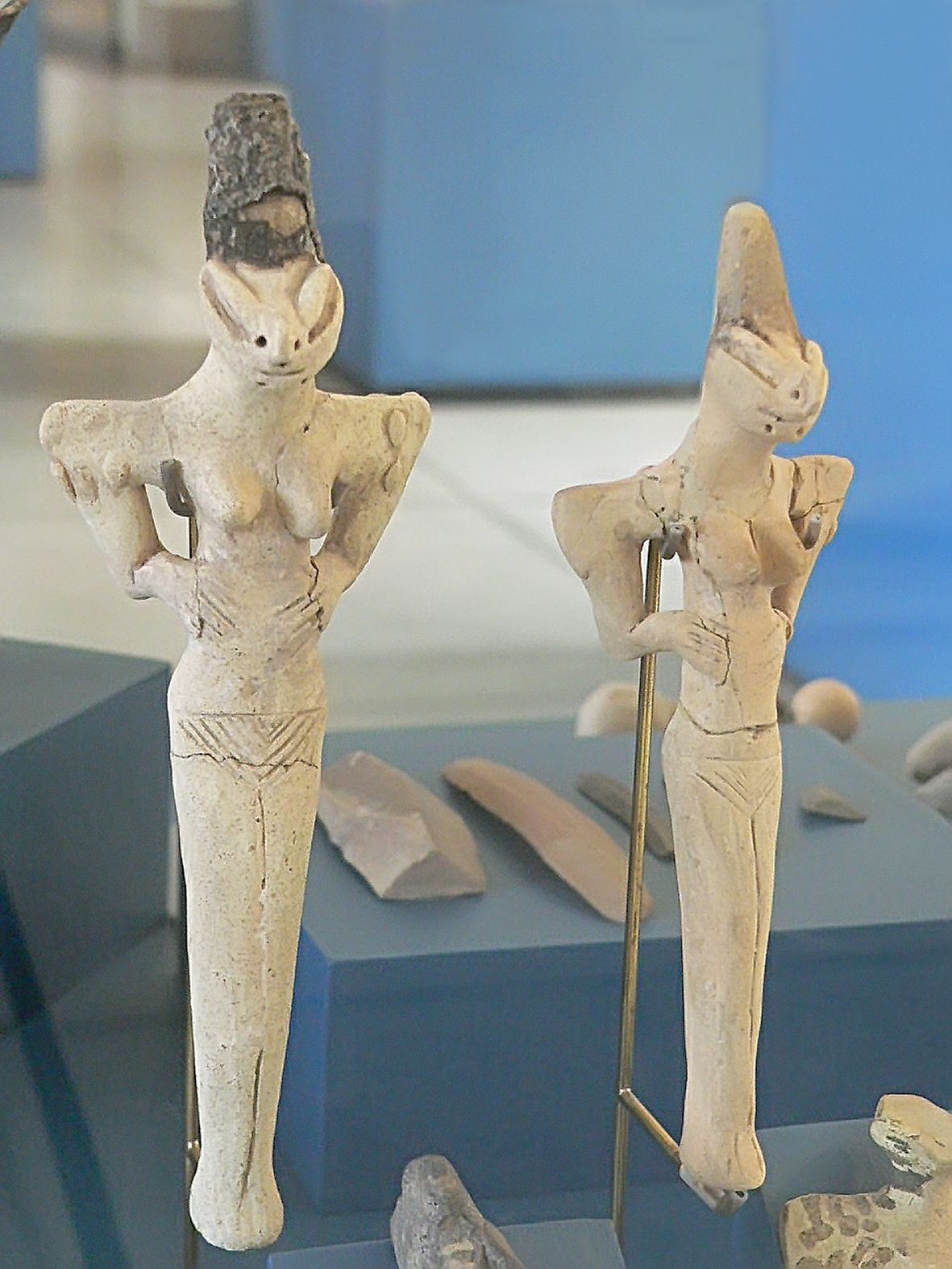
Ophidian figurines of women from Ur (Ubaid 4)

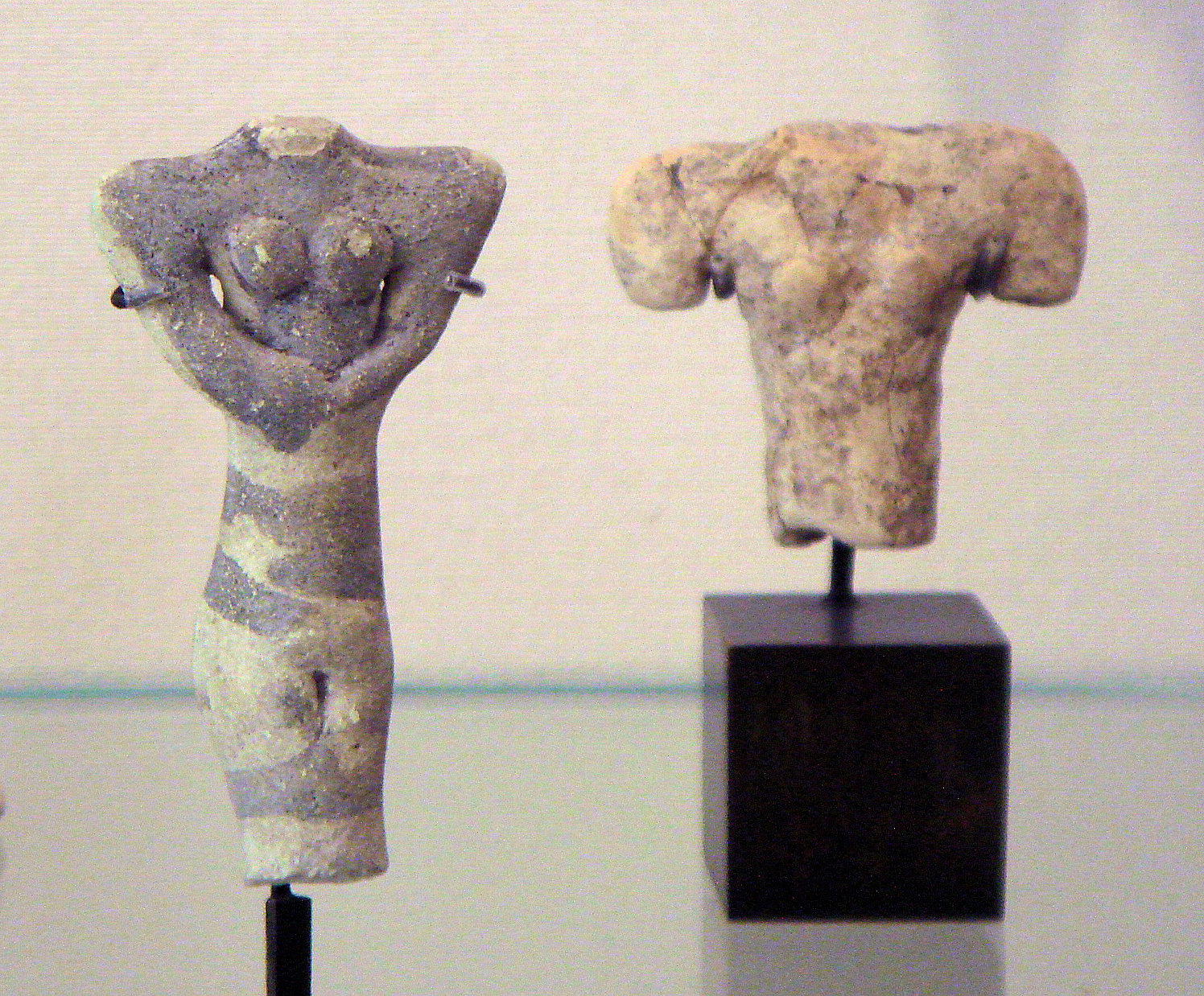
Ubaid IV; two figurines of women; c. 4700 – c. 4200 BC; Tell Tello; Louvre Museum AO 15327

=== Stamp seals ===
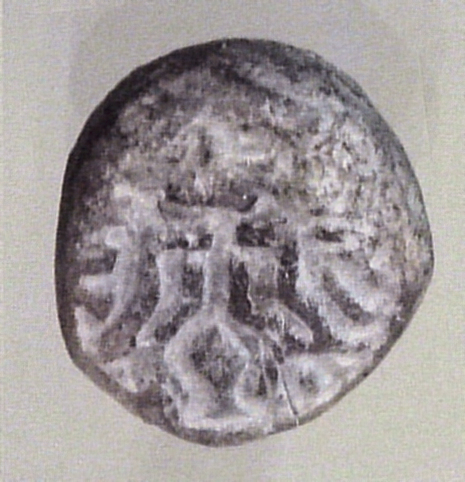
Ubaid 5 stamp seal with master of animals motif from Girsu, currently in the Louvre Museum (AO14165)

Stamp seals had been in use in Upper Mesopotamia since the seventh millennium BC. By the time of the Ubaid period, a wide range of motifs had developed, including geometric patterns and depictions of animals and occasionally, humans. The Ubaid period saw the first depictions of ibex-headed and bird-headed humans.

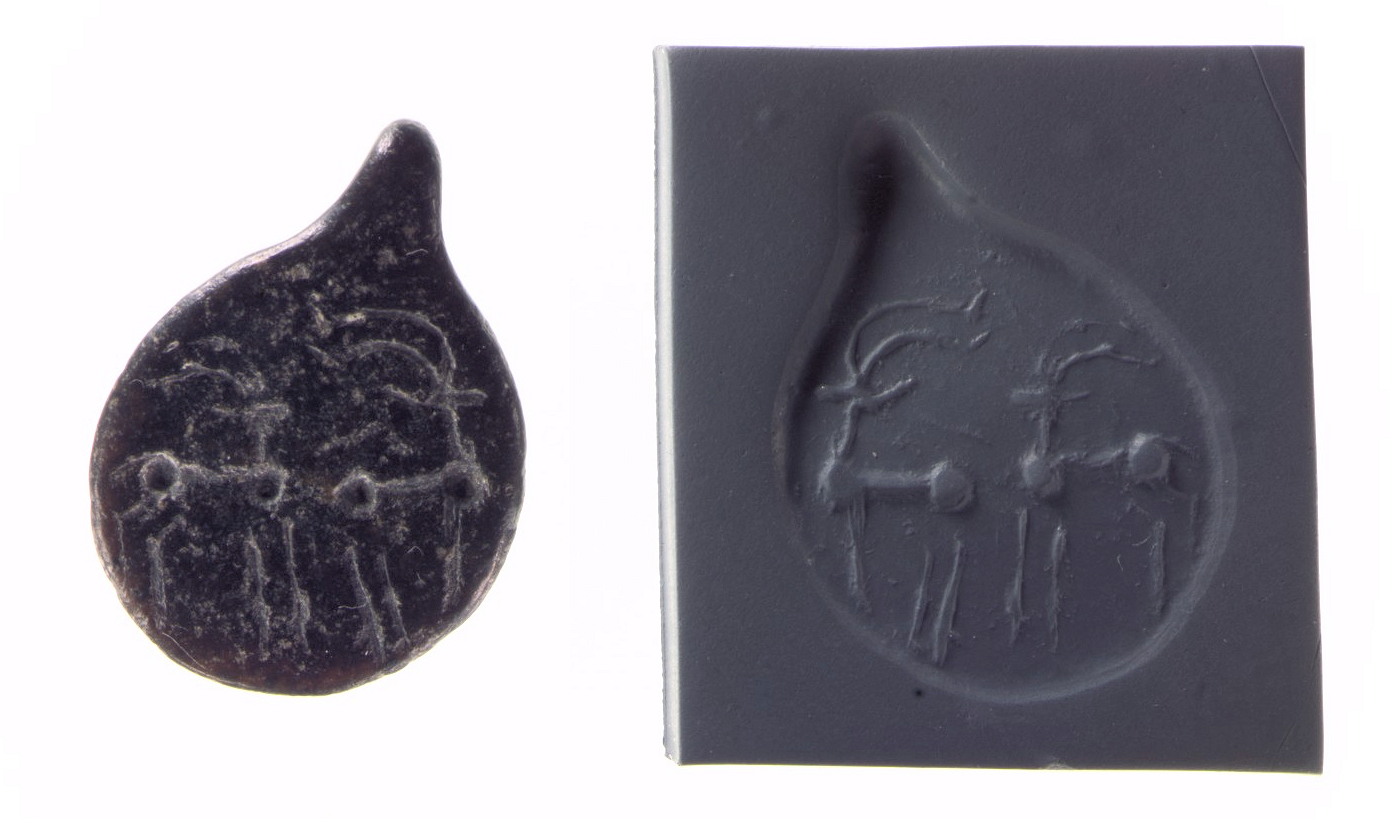
Late Ubaid – Middle Gawra (c. 4500–3500 BC) pendant seal and modern impression with quadrupeds motif from northern Mesopotamia, currently in the Metropolitan Museum of Art ( 93.17.122)

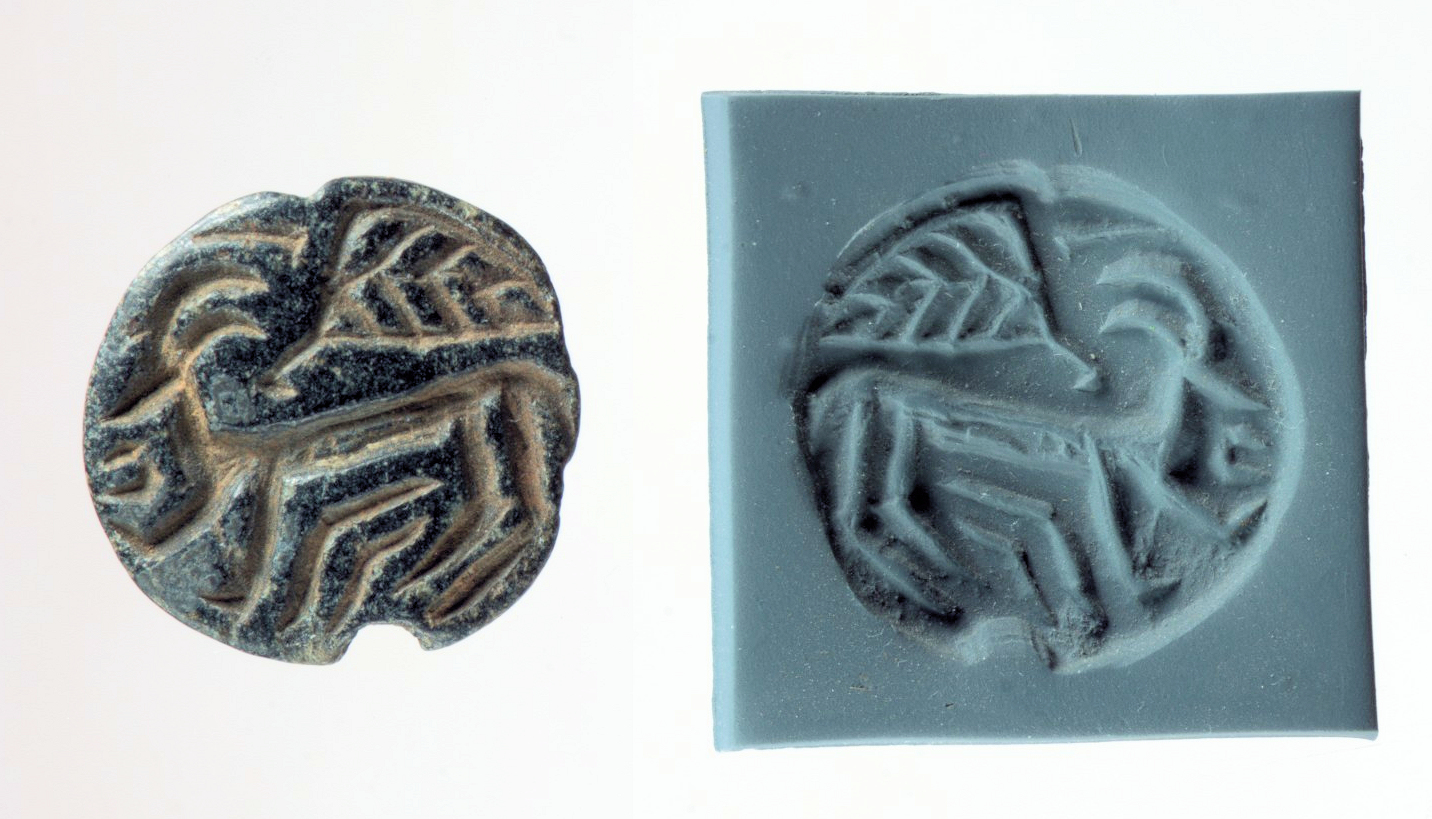
Ubaid (6th–5th millennium BC) stamp seal and modern impression with horned animal and bird motif from northern Syria or southeastern Anatolia, currently in the Metropolitan Museum of Art (1984.175.13)

=== Pottery ===
The Ubaid period was first distinguished on the basis of its painted pottery. Ceramics continue to be a main characteristic to determine the chronology and geographical distribution of the period. The paint varies from black to brown, purple, and dark green and the pottery fabric usually has a buff to red-green brown color. Ubaid 1–2 pottery had dense, geometric, and abstract decoration. Later pottery was less decorated, with bands and swags being the most common patterns of decoration. The slow potter's wheel came into use during Ubaid 3–4, which may have played a role in the decrease in decoration.

The coarse, plant-tempered coba bowl pottery found at many Late and Post-Ubaid sites in northern Mesopotamia has been interpreted as some kind of vessel for handing out rations or as evidence of more specialized production, and as such, may have been a precursor of the beveled rim bowl from the Uruk period. As with many other aspects of Ubaid material culture, it is possible to distinguish different geographical traditions in the production of the coba bowl during the Ubaid period.

Ubaid pottery

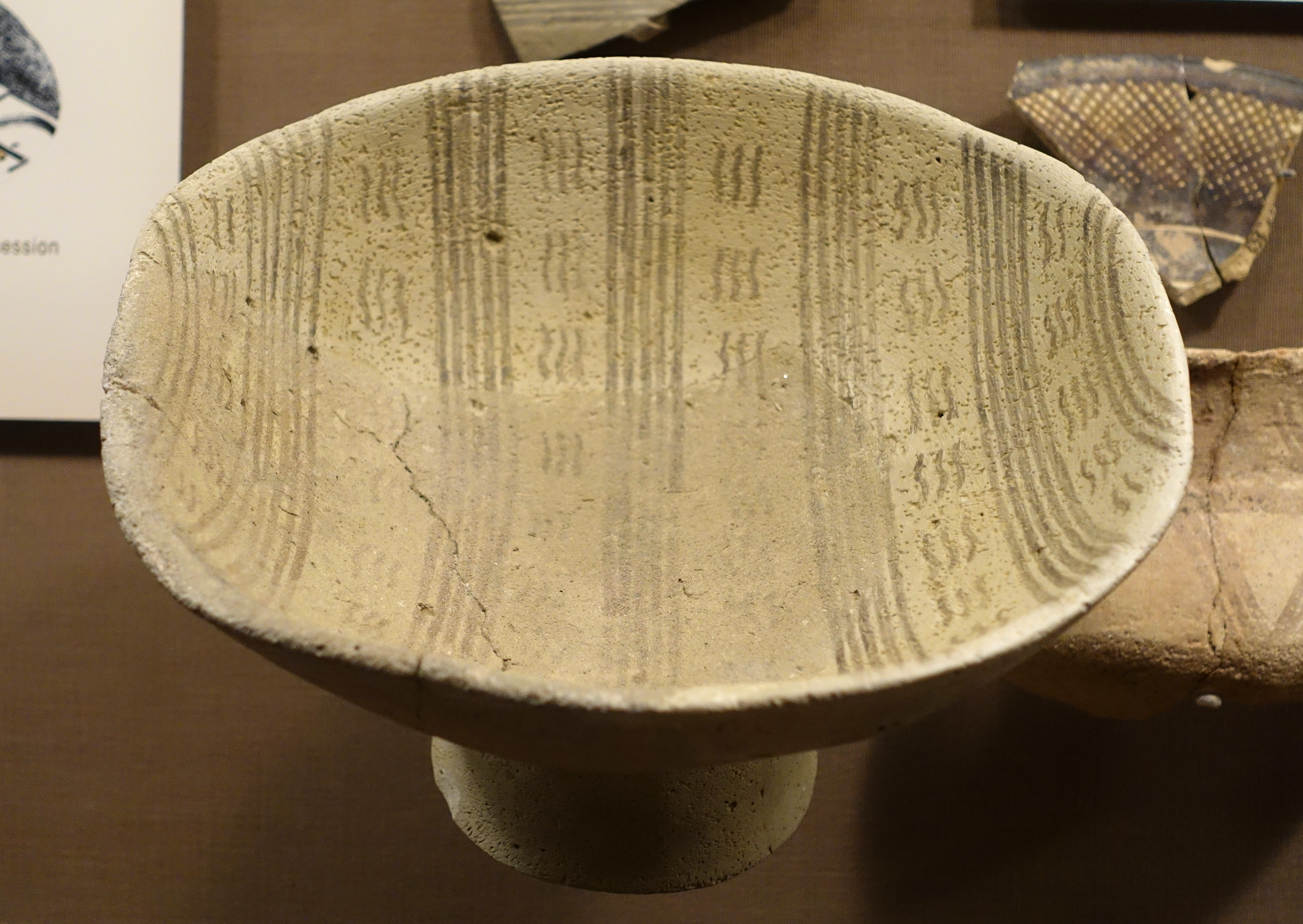
Ubaid 0-1 footed bowl from Godin Tepe, currently in the Oriental Institute Museum

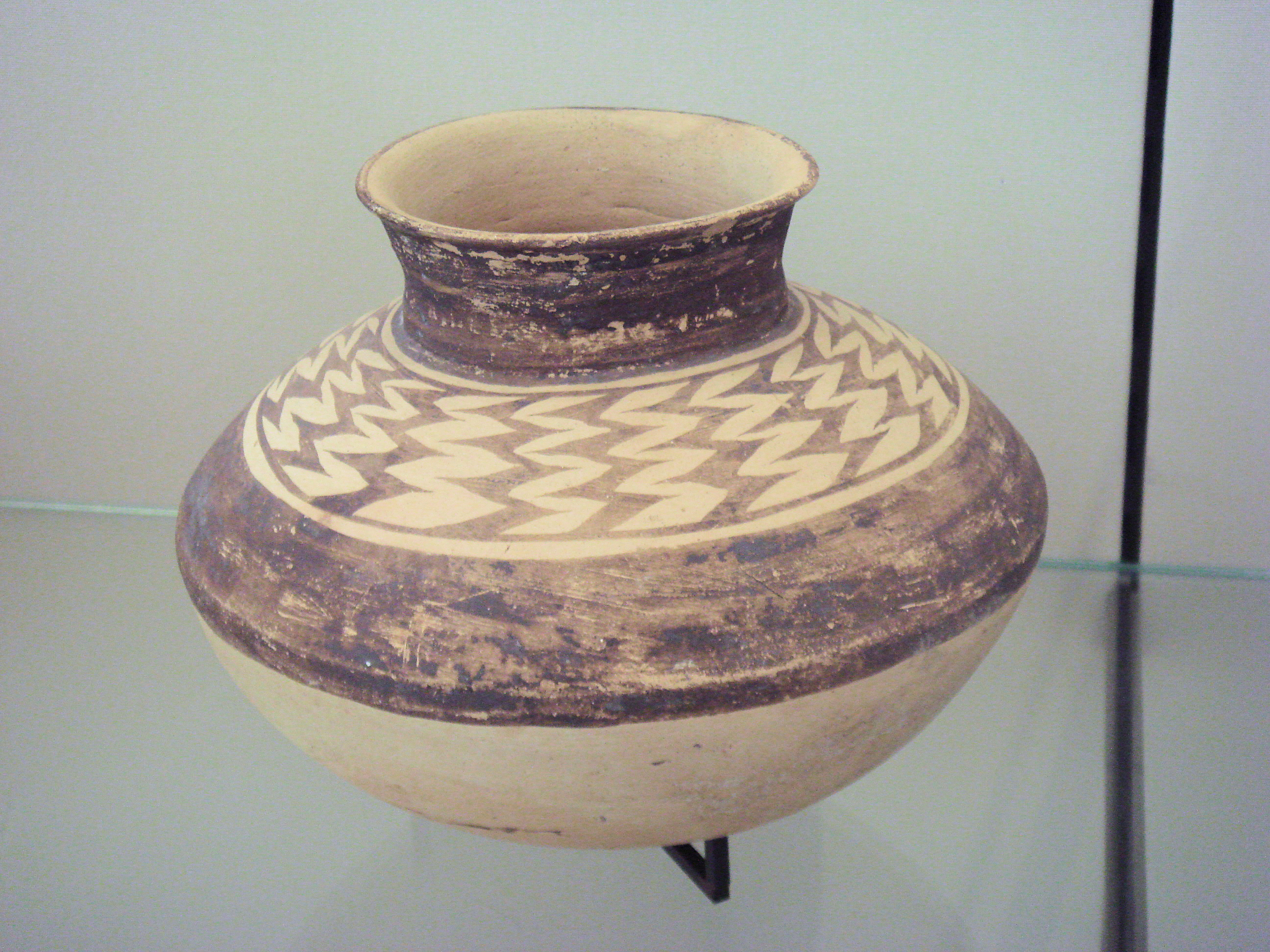
Ubaid 3 pottery, currently in the Louvre Museum (AO 29611)

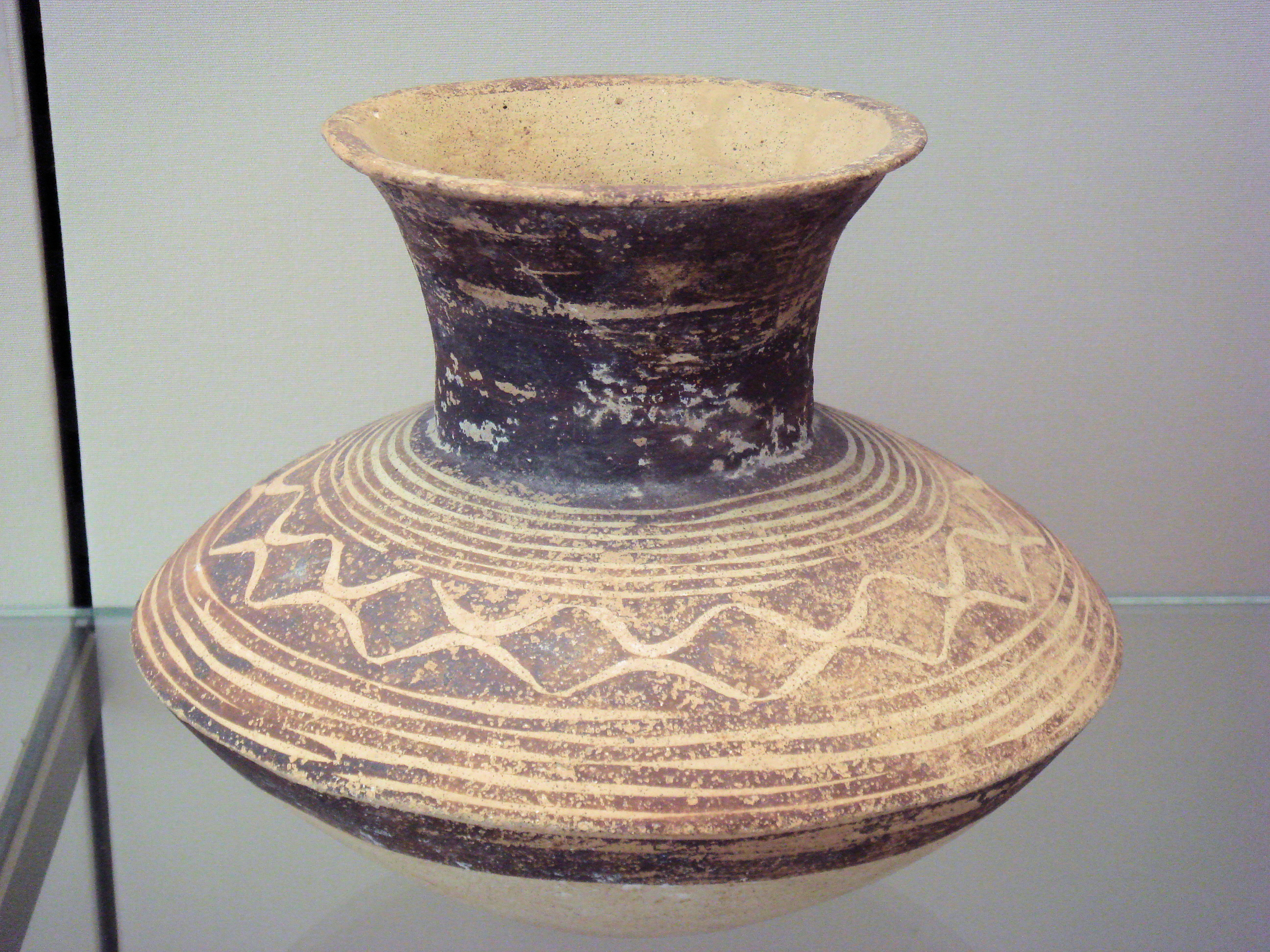
Ubaid 3 pottery, currently in the Louvre Museum (AO 29598)

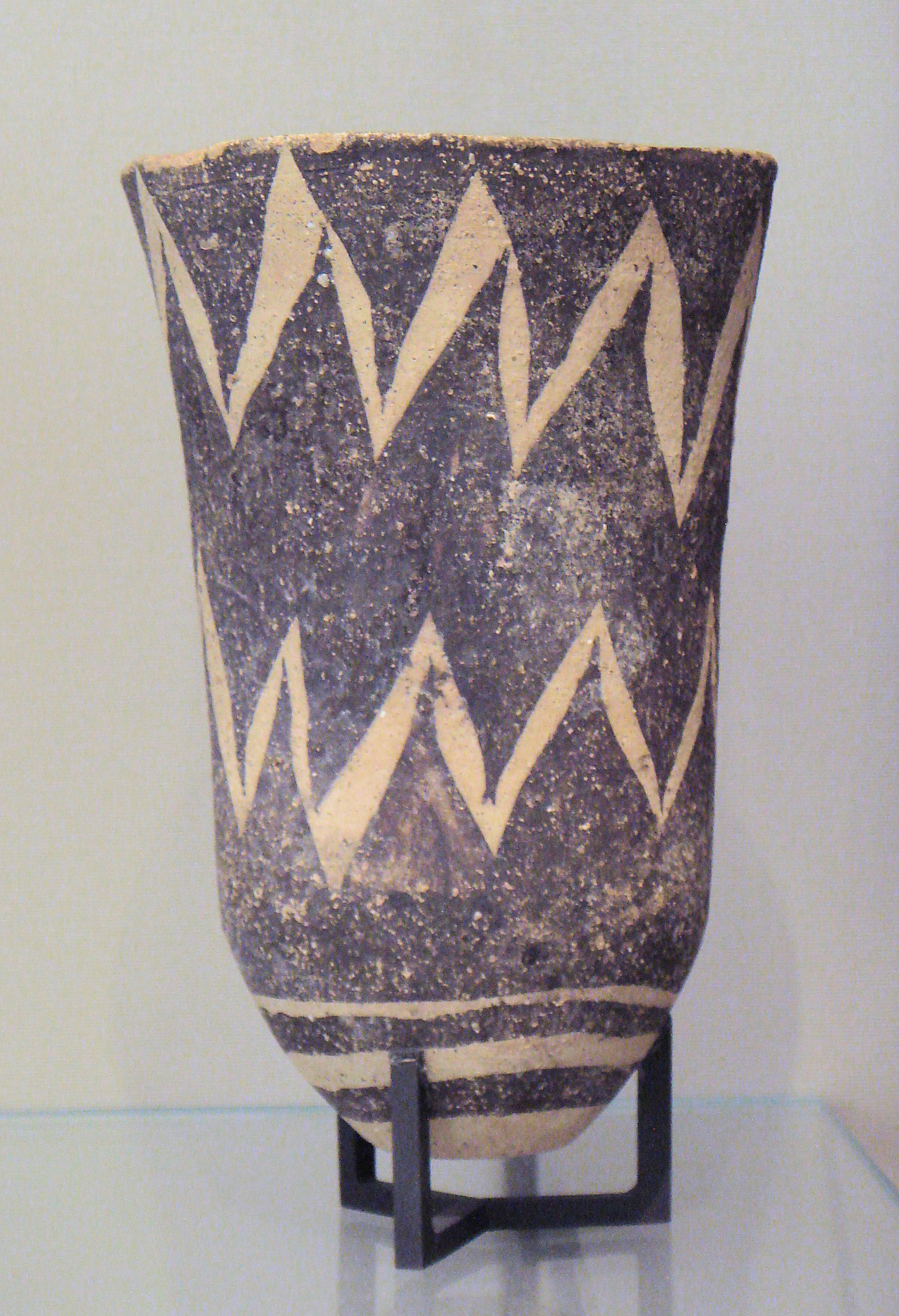
Ubaid 3 pottery, currently in the Louvre Museum (AO 29616)

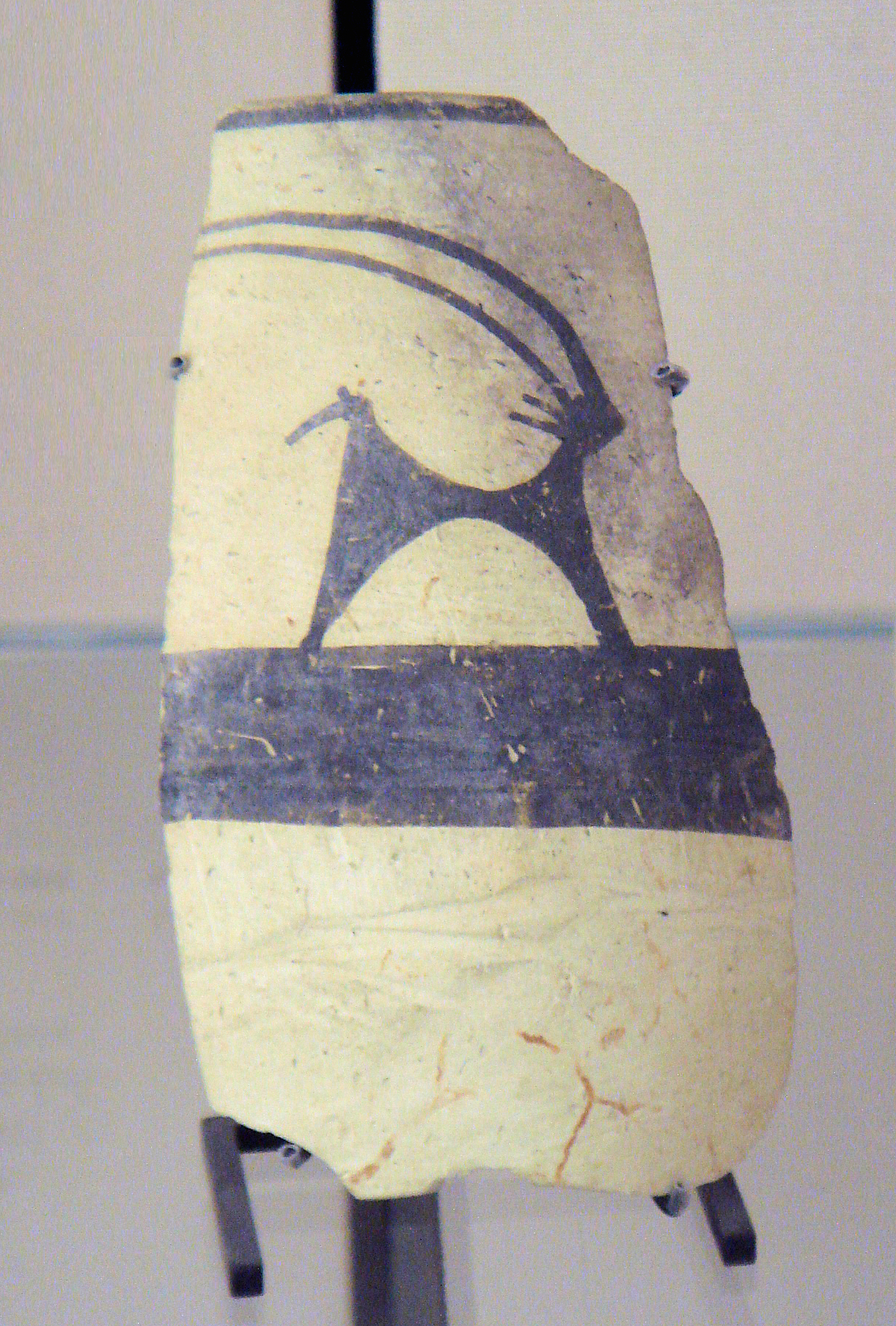
Ubaid 5 pottery from Girsu, currently in the Louvre Museum (AO 15338)

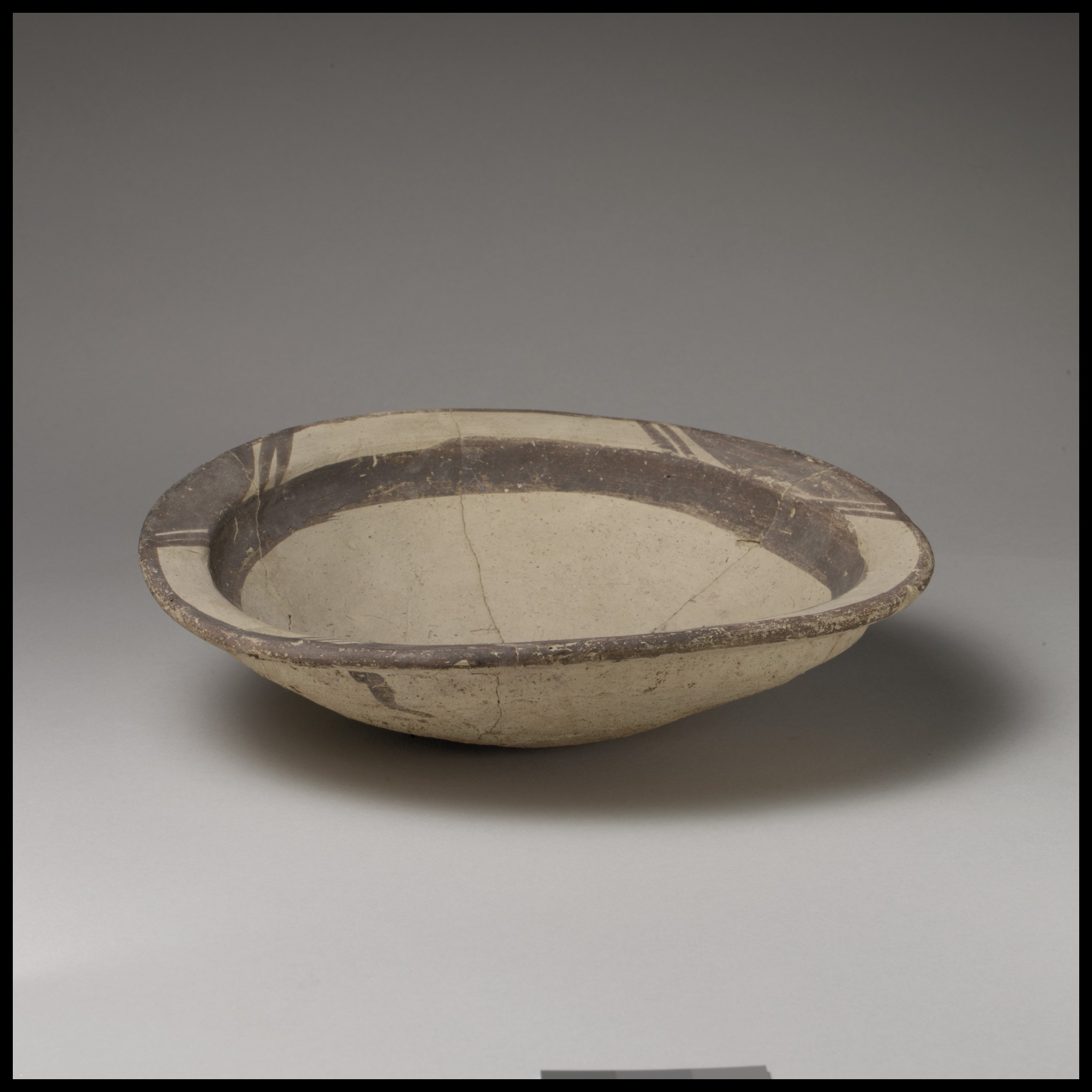
Bowl; mid 6th–5th millennium BC; ceramic; 6.99 cm; Tell Abu Shahrain; Metropolitan Museum of Art

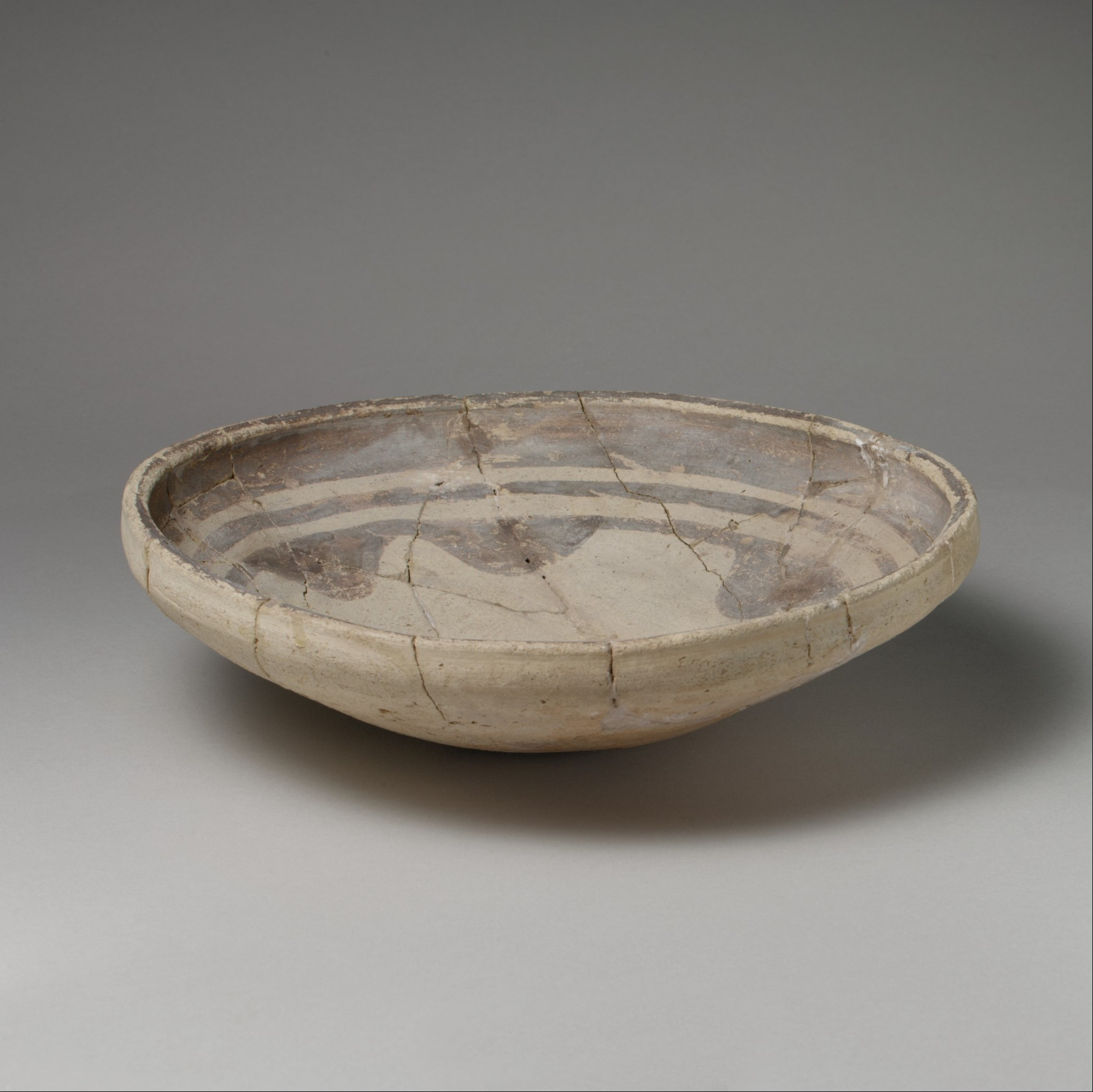
Bowl; mid 6th–5th millennium BC; ceramic; Tell Abu Shahrain; Metropolitan Museum of Art

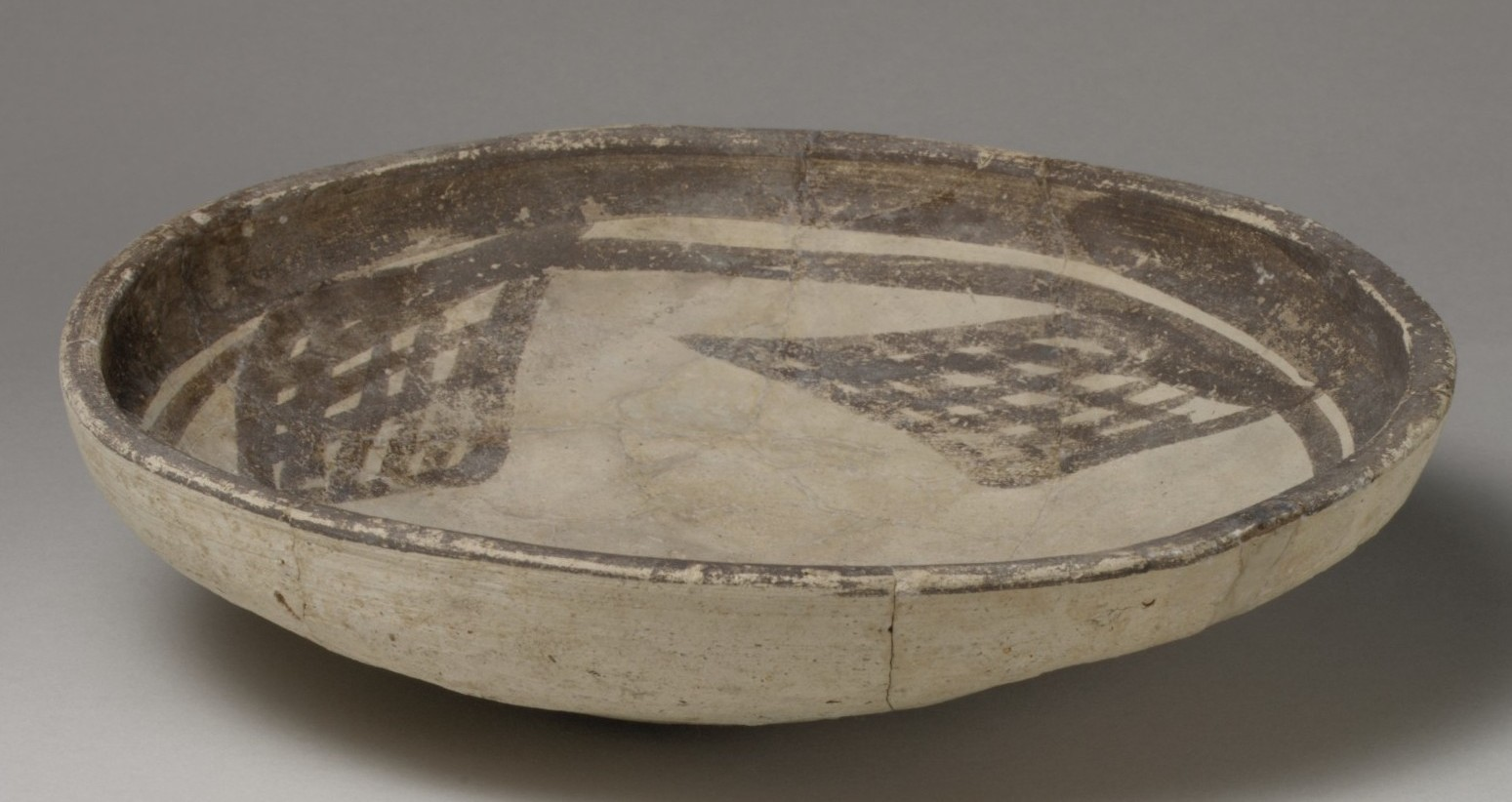
Bowl; mid 6th–5th millennium BC; ceramic; 5.08 cm; Tell Abu Shahrain; Metropolitan Museum of Art

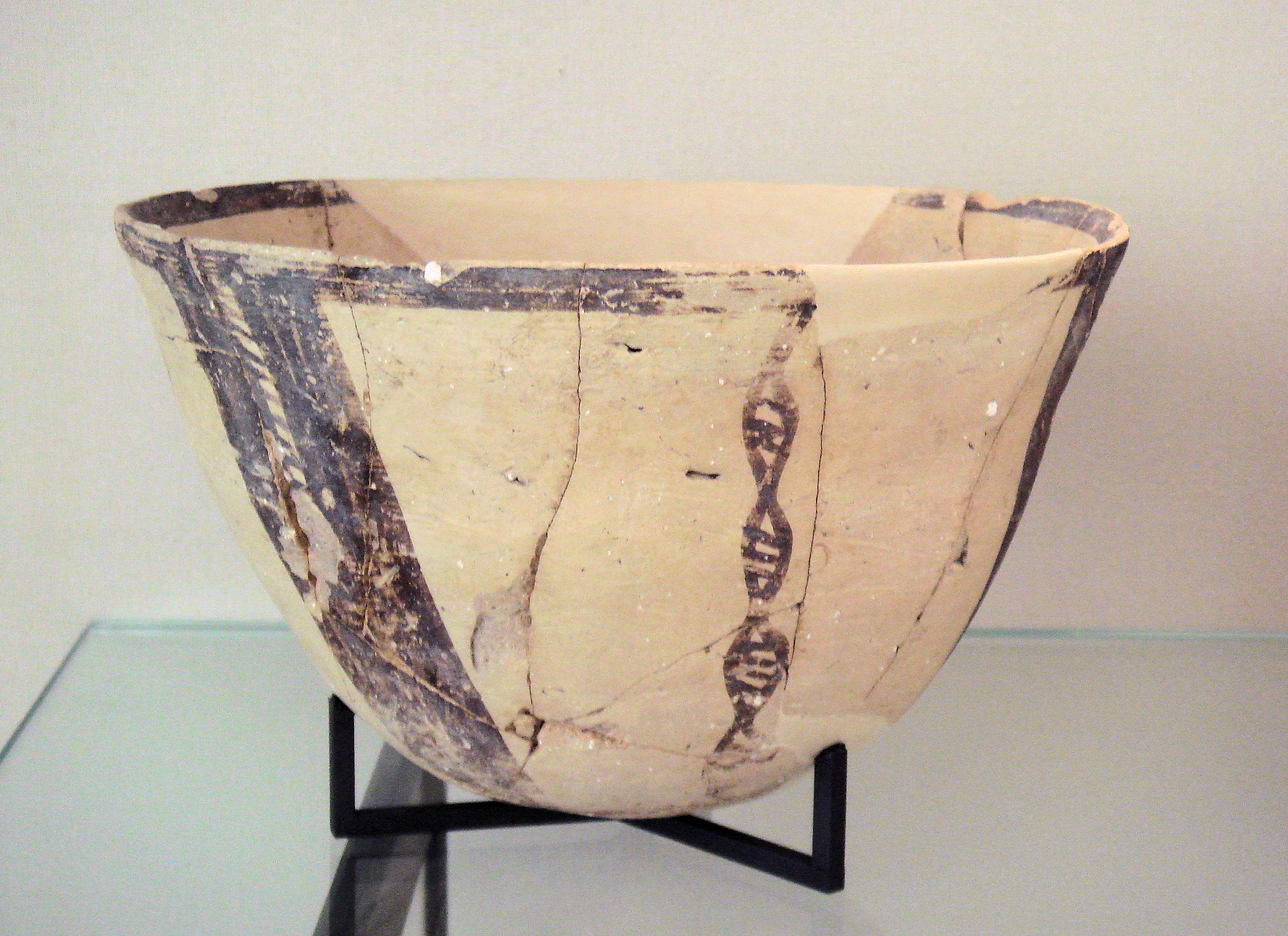
Pottery; c. 5100 – c. 4500 BC; ceramic; Tepe Gawra; Louvre Museum

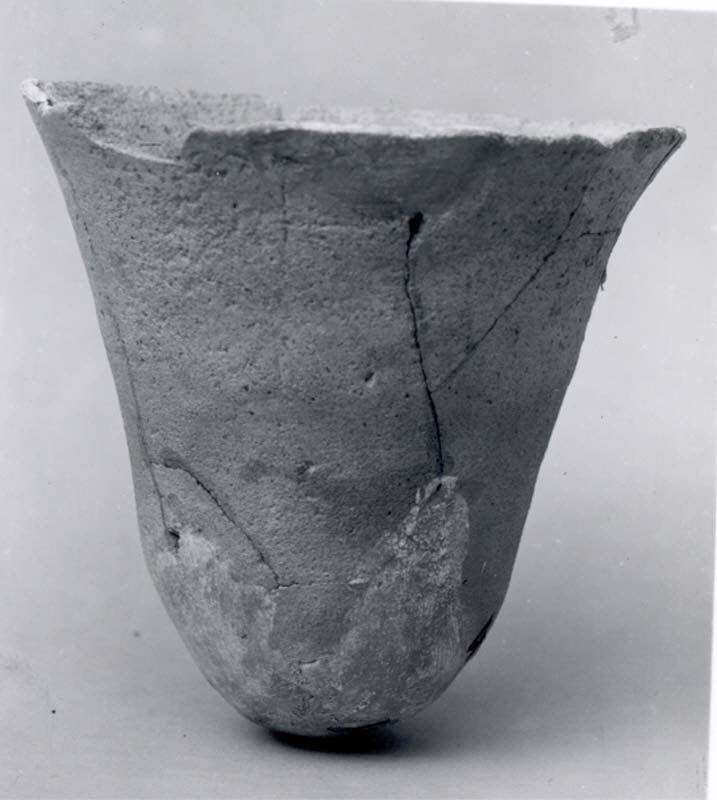
Cup; mid 6th–5th millennium BC; ceramic; 8.56 cm; Tell Abu Shahrain; Metropolitan Museum of Art

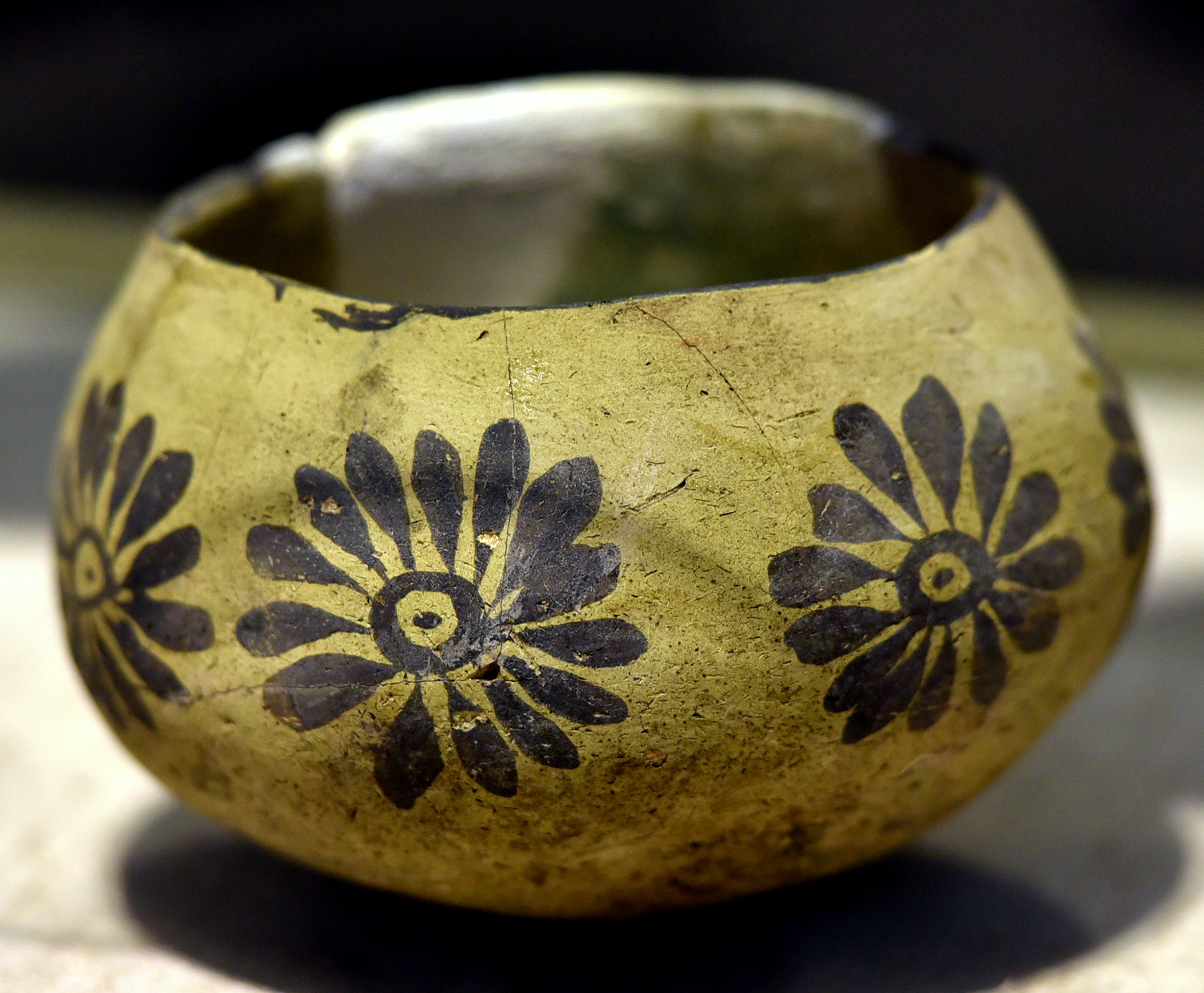
Pottery bowl with a rounded bottom and monochrome paint (rosettes); c. 5000 BC; Telul eth-Thalathat; Iraq Museum

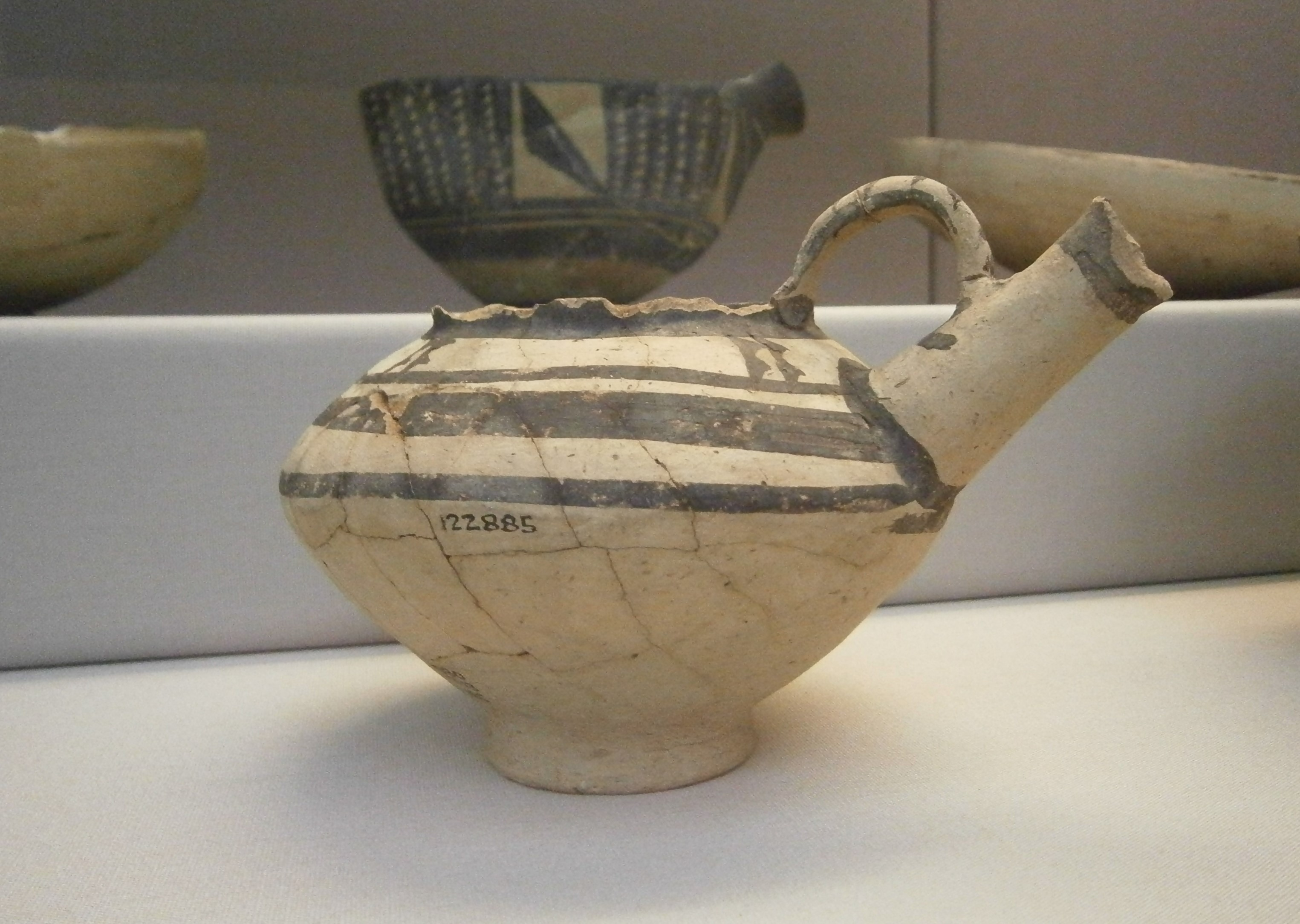
Late Ubaid; spouted jar decorated with geometric designs in dark paint; c. 5200 – c. 4200 BC; Tell el-Muqayyar; British Museum

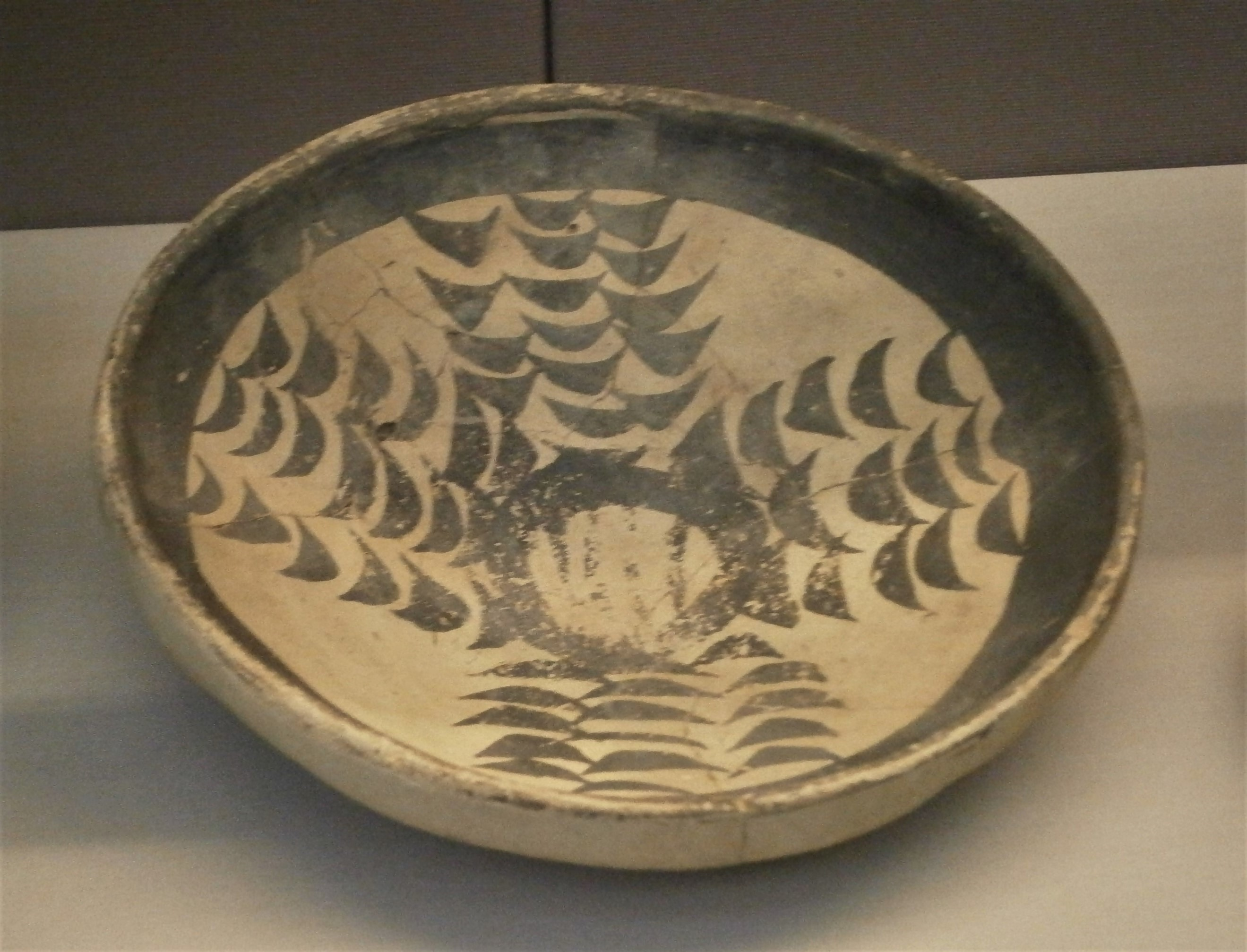
Late Ubaid; painted bowl, decorated with geometric designs in dark paint; c. 5200 – c. 4200 BC; Tell el-Muqayyar; British Museum

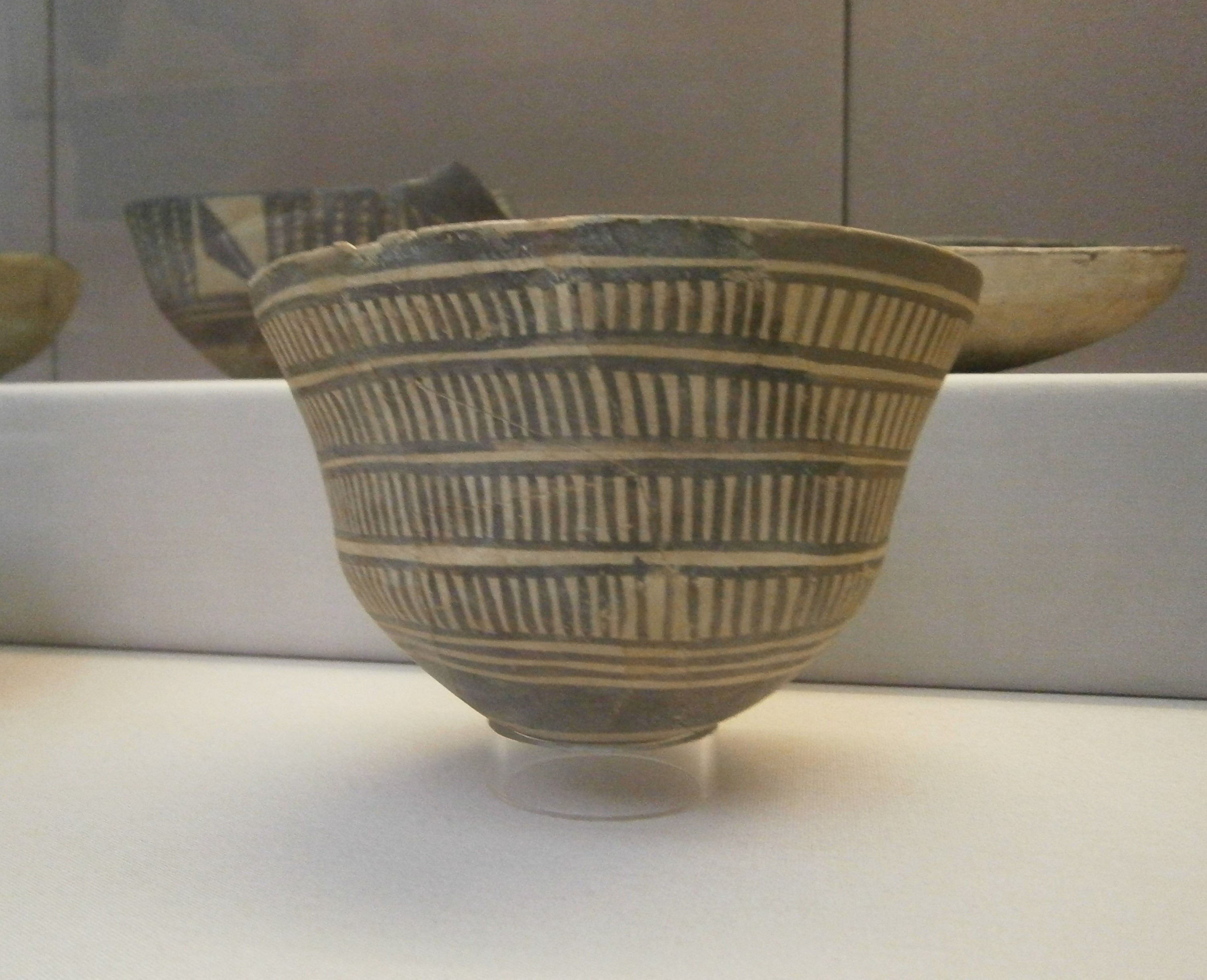
Late Ubaid; painted cup, decorated with geometric designs in dark paint tattoos; c. 5200 – c. 4200 BC

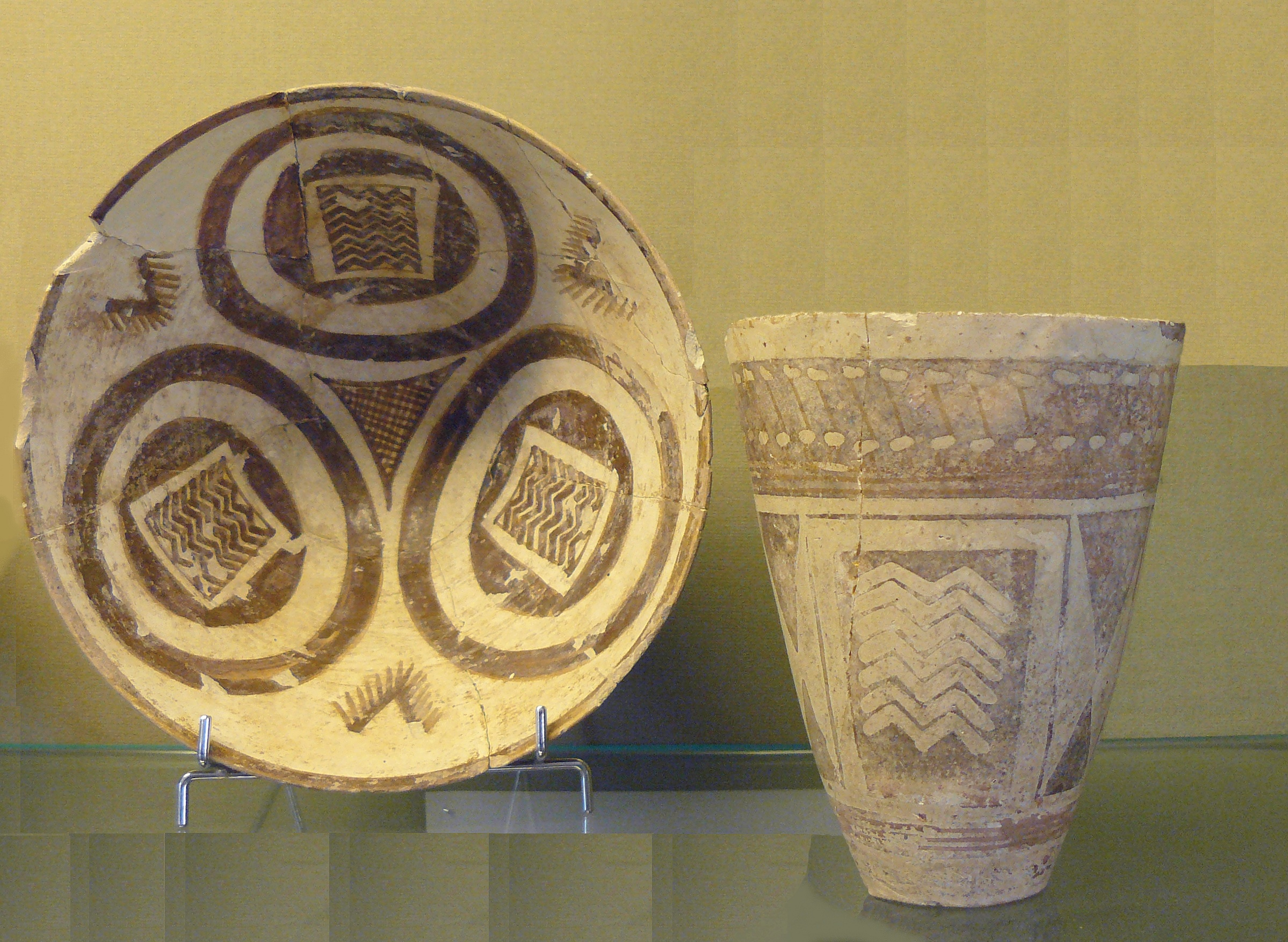
Goblet and cup; c. 4000 BC; Susa; Sèvres – Cité de la céramique museum

=== Stone tools ===
Flint was widely available in Mesopotamia and could be sourced from outcrops in the mountains of Zagros and Jebel Sinjar, from limestone and river terraces in northern Mesopotamia, and from alluvial deposits in southern Mesopotamia. Different qualities of flint were used, depending on what kind of tool was made from it. For example, blades were made from a higher quality flint than other tools, and they may have been produced off-site, indicating that not only raw materials but also finished products were transported over larger distances. Flint was used for a variety of tools, including arrowheads, sickle blades, hoes that are sometimes considered a hallmark of the Ubaid, and a variety of tools for piercing and drilling. Flint assemblages display both regional and temporal variation.

Obsidian was also in use during the Ubaid, although the percentage of obsidian tools that was found at archaeological sites fluctuates widely across Mesopotamia. At sites along the middle Euphrates, only few pieces were usually found, and the number of obsidian artefacts was also limited in southern Mesopotamian sites. At sites along the Khabur and the upper Tigris, obsidian was more common. Also, obsidian seems to have been less common during the Ubaid than during the preceding Halaf period and the subsequent Uruk period. Obsidian could be transported over hundreds of kilometers. For example, obsidian tools found along the Gulf coast at sites such as Dosariyah (Saudi Arabia) and Wadi Debayan (Qatar) came from sources in southeastern Turkey.

The Ubaid may have witnessed a shift in the production of flint tools from being carried out as a domestic activity to a more specialized activity carried out by dedicated craftspeople. This may have been associated with the introduction of Canaanean blade technology, which became common in the fourth millennium BC that may have been linked to increased mass-production and intensification of agricultural strategies.

=== Metallurgy ===
Evidence for metallurgy comes from several sites in Upper Mesopotamia, all dating to the final stages of the Ubaid period. At Mersin, Level XVI (5000–4900 BC), unalloyed copper pins and chisels were found. At southeastern Anatolian sites such as Değirmentepe and Norşuntepe, metallurgical production was practiced during the Ubaid 3, as evidenced by furnaces and related finds. At late fifth millennium Tell Nader, northern Iraq, kilns were excavated that may have been used for the production of both pottery and metal. Copper objects are also known from the Ubaid levels at Tepe Gawra (XVII–XII) and Tell Arpachiyah. Copper objects were absent in the Ubaid levels at Eridu and 'Oueili, possibly indicating that copper use spread southward from the north. However, copper may have been traded, as it was present in elite burials of the Susa I (terminal Ubaid) necropolis at Susa east of the Tigris. In general, copper objects seem to be very rare and gold has not been found at Ubaid sites.

=== Boats and boat models ===
The Ubaid period provides the first evidence for boating in the ancient Near East. Ceramic boat models have been recovered from numerous sites across Mesopotamia, from Zeidan and Tell Mashnaqa in modern-day northern Syria to Eridu and 'Oueili in the south and Abada in the Hamrin. These models date from Ubaid 1–4, but become more common from Ubaid 3 onward. The models indicate that different boat types may have been in use, including reed boats, and boats with masts. It has been noted that no evidence for boats has been recovered from Halaf sites in northern Mesopotamia, and that Ubaid 3, from which more boat models have been recovered, coincides with the expansion of the Ubaid toward the north and into the Persian Gulf.

At the site of H3 in modern-day Kuwait, a ceramic boat model and a ceramic disc with an image of a two-masted boat were recovered. The latter is the oldest evidence for the use of masts and sails. At the same site, pieces of bitumen with barnacles attached to one side and reed-impressions on the other sides were recovered. These pieces are the earliest evidence for boats in Western Asia, and the earliest evidence for seagoing vessels in the world.

=== Wool production ===
Evidence for the production of wool is ambiguous and mostly indirect. Wool-bearing sheep have been clearly attested in Uruk-period sites, and the domestication of sheep and goat started in the ninth millennium BC, but exactly when wool-production emerged between those two fixed points is unclear. There is some evidence for emerging wool production in the fifth millennium BC, i.e. late Ubaid. Some of the earliest evidence comes in the form of an animal figurine from Iran dated to c. 5000 BC with incised decorations that might possibly represent wool. At Kosak Shamali, an Ubaid site in northern Syria, indirect evidence for wool production has been found in the form of spindle whorls, clay scrapers, and a clay sealing with a cord impression that might have come from rope spun from wool fibers. The animal bone assemblage at this site had a large percentage of domesticated sheep and goat, with changes in the assemblage suggesting that the production of secondary products (such as wool and milk) became more important toward the late Ubaid and the Uruk period. The spindle whorls from Kosak Shamali, and also those from Telul eth-Thalathat II (northern Iraq), gradually decreased in weight, which could indicate that more and more finer-quality or softer fibers were spun. At Tell Surezha (Iraqi Kurdistan), evidence from animal bones also suggests that wool production may have been important.

=== Burials ===
The most common burial practice during the Ubaid seems to have been primary inhumation; i.e. burial of the complete body. During Ubaid 4, some 80% (adults) and 94% (infants) of the burials consisted of primary inhumations. The dead were often accompanied by personal adornments such as beads, necklaces, and headdresses. Pots (presumably) containing foodstuffs were also common. Pieces of red ochre have also been recovered from graves. Burials have been excavated at many Ubaid sites, with exceptionally large numbers coming from Tell Abada (127 infant burials) and Eridu (193 burials).

By the fifth millennium BC, children and adults were given differing treatments in death. The available evidence indicates that infants were primarily buried inside the settlement, often near larger, presumably more important dwellings, and often in pots. The association of child burials with larger buildings is well-illustrated at the sites of Tell Abada and Tepe Gawra. It has been suggested that this pattern of child burials near larger dwellings was related to increasing social differentiation between kin groups. Adults, on the other hand, were buried at the edge of the settlement in communal burial grounds in pit burials or inside clay boxes. Such burial grounds have for example been excavated at Eridu.

These burial practices represent a clear break from those of the preceding Late Neolithic period. During the Late Neolithic, burials were often secondary and burial treatment was very diverse. The Ubaid witnessed a marked shift toward primary burial, less diverse burial customs, and less diversity in burial gifts. This shift has been interpreted as a reflection of changing perceptions of personhood.

=== Body modification ===
Evidence for cranial modification, i.e. deliberate headshaping, among both men and women, has come from many archaeological sites throughout wider Mesopotamia. Where headshaping was detected, it was all of the same type, i.e. one- or two-band circumferential headshaping, which results in an elongated shape of the head. Different types of headshaping were practiced prior to and after the Ubaid period across the Near East, but it seems that the specific technique of circumferential headshaping may have originated in Iran, east of the area of Ubaid influence, and reached its peak during the Ubaid period. It has been interpreted as a marker for socio-cultural group affiliation during the Ubaid.

Labrets and/or ear-spools were likewise recovered from many archaeological Ubaid sites across Mesopotamia and its border regions. In at least one case from southwestern Iran, a labret was found in situ in a burial, located at the mandible of the buried individual and with associated tooth wear indicating that it had been worn. Labrets were absent from Halaf sites in northern Mesopotamia, again indicating that they may have been important markers of socio-cultural identity during the Ubaid. Their use seems to have declined again during the Uruk period.

== Subsistence economy ==
=== Agriculture ===
The modern excavations at Tell Zeidan have revealed a wealth of information on the subsistence economy of a large northern Mesopotamian Ubaid settlement. Cultivated species included barley, wheat, lentil, ervil, and flax. There is some evidence that the inhabitants of Zeidan practiced a form of floodwater irrigation on agricultural lands. The excavators have suggested that the unpredictability of this type of irrigation may have been a factor in increasing social complexity. The relative absence of animal dung, and the common presence of charred wood remains, suggests that wood was used as fuel. At Surezha, dung was commonly used for fuel, and there is some evidence that cattle were used as traction animals for plowing fields.

=== Animal husbandry ===
Tell Zeidan again provides a wealth of information. The composition of the animal bone assemblage from Zeidan changed considerably from the Halaf to the Ubaid period. During the Halaf, some 50% of the animal bones came from wild species (indicative of hunting), whereas during the Ubaid more than 90% represented domesticated species (indicative of herding and keeping animals). Common animals were sheep, goat, cattle, and pigs. A comparison with other Ubaid sites in northern Mesopotamia showed that, in general, pastoralism became more important and reliance on wild fauna decreased somewhat, but this pattern was not so evident at other sites as it was at Zeidan. There was no indication at Zeidan that there was spatial differentiation across the site in how animal products were consumed, suggesting that food stuffs were not a means to express social differentiation.

=== Fishing ===
The Ubaid-related sites along the Persian Gulf coast provide evidence for fishing. The range of species recovered at H3, for example, indicates that fishing probably mainly took place in shallow coastal waters. Tuna, which cannot be caught in Kuwait Bay anymore, also was found at the site. Fish may have been a local commodity that was traded for the Mesopotamian pottery that has been found at sites along the Persian Gulf.

== Society ==
The Ubaid culture and contemporary cultures circa 5000 BC

Ubaid culture is characterized by large unwalled village settlements, multi-roomed rectangular mud-brick houses and the appearance of the first temples of public architecture in Mesopotamia, with a growth of a two-tier settlement hierarchy of centralized large sites of more than ten hectares surrounded by smaller village sites of less than one hectare. Domestic equipment included a distinctive fine quality buff or greenish colored pottery decorated with geometric designs in brown or black paint. Tools such as sickles were often made of hard fired clay in the south, while in the north stone and sometimes metal were used. Villages thus contained specialised craftspeople, potters, weavers, and metalworkers, although the bulk of the population were agricultural labourers, farmers, and seasonal pastoralists.

During the Ubaid period (5000–4000 BC), the movement toward urbanization began. "Agriculture and animal husbandry [domestication] were widely practiced in sedentary communities". There were also tribes who practiced domesticating animals as far north as Turkey, and as far south as the Zagros Mountains. The Ubaid period in the south was associated with intensive irrigated hydraulic agriculture, and the use of the plough, both introduced from the north, possibly through the earlier Choga Mami, Hadji Muhammed, and Samarra cultures.

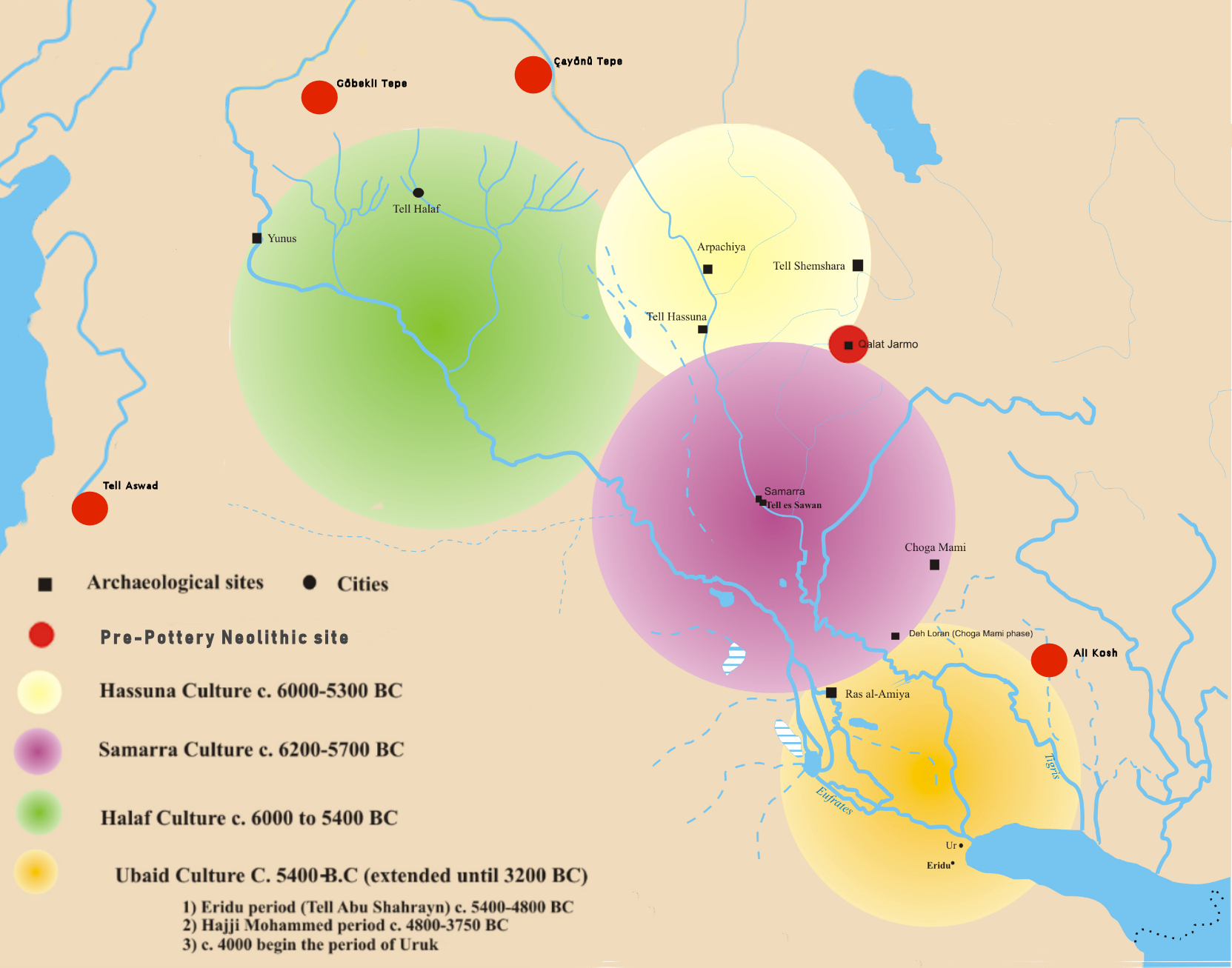
A map of the Near East depicting the approximate extent of the: Pre-Pottery Neolithic Sites Hassuna culture Samarra culture Halaf culture Ubaid culture

The Ubaid period as a whole, based upon the analysis of grave goods, was one of increasingly polarized social stratification and decreasing egalitarianism. Bogucki describes this as a phase of "Trans-egalitarian" competitive households, in which some fall behind as a result of downward social mobility. Morton Fried and Elman Service have hypothesised that Ubaid culture saw the rise of an elite class of hereditary chieftains, perhaps heads of kin groups linked in some way to the administration of the temple shrines and their granaries, responsible for mediating intra-group conflict and maintaining social order. It would seem that various collective methods, perhaps instances of what Thorkild Jacobsen called primitive democracy, in which disputes were previously resolved through a council of one's peers, were no longer sufficient for the needs of the local community.

Ubaid culture originated in the south, but still has clear connections to earlier cultures in the region of middle Iraq. The appearance of the Ubaid culture has sometimes been linked to the so-called Sumerian problem, related to the origins of Sumerian civilisation. Whatever the ethnic origins of this group, this culture saw for the first time a clear tripartite social division among intensive subsistence peasant farmers, with crops and animals coming from the north, tent-dwelling nomadic pastoralists dependent upon their herds, and hunter-fisher folk of the Arabian littoral, living in reed huts.

Stein and Özbal describe the Near East oecumene that resulted from Ubaid expansion, contrasting it to the colonial expansionism of the later Uruk period. "A contextual analysis comparing different regions shows that the Ubaid expansion took place largely through the peaceful spread of an ideology, leading to the formation of numerous new indigenous identities that appropriated and transformed superficial elements of Ubaid material culture into locally distinct expressions."

There is some evidence of warfare during the Ubaid period although it is extremely rare. The "Burnt Village" at Tell Sabi Abyad could be suggestive of destruction during war, but it could also have been due to other causes, such as wildfire or accident. Ritual burning is also possible since the bodies inside were already dead by the time they were burned. A mass grave at Tepe Gawra contained 24 bodies apparently buried without any funeral rituals, possibly indicating it was a mass grave from violence. Copper weapons were also present in the form of arrow heads and sling bullets, although these could have been used for other purpose; two clay pots recovered from the era have decorations showing arrows used for the purpose of hunting. A copper axe head was made in the late Ubaid period, which could have been a tool or a weapon.

During the late Ubaid period around 4500–4000 BC, there was some increase in social polarization, with central houses in the settlements becoming larger. But there were no real cities until the later Uruk period.

=== Language, ethnicity, and genetics ===
The languages that were spoken during the Ubaid period cannot be determined. Despite the fact that the Ubaid period is prehistorical, it has featured prominently in discussions on the origin and presence of the Sumerian and Akkadian languages in Sumer. This debate has been called the "Sumerian problem" or "Sumerian question". The starting point of this debate was that the oldest cuneiform tablets were written in Sumerian, and that earlier pictographical tablets from the Late Uruk and Jemdet Nasr periods (3200–3000 BC) were likely written in the same language. Based on this evidence, Henri Frankfort proposed in the 1930s that the people who wrote and presumably spoke Sumerian, originally came from the Iranian highlands and settled Mesopotamia at the start of the Ubaid period. Speiser, on the other hand, thought that the Sumerians entered Mesopotamia during the Uruk period and interpreted the regional styles that existed before that time, i.e. Ubaid, Hassuna, Halaf, as evidence of distinct ethnic groups.

More recent discussion has taken a more careful approach, taking pains not to equate pots with people or language with ethnicity. Archaeologists have stressed that a high degree of cultural continuity is evident throughout the Ubaid and Uruk periods, and it seems that there is some agreement that "the relation between three categories, linguistic, racial and ethnic, is exceedingly complex in Mesopotamia and still far from being sufficiently investigated".

Scarce DNA analysis of human skeletal material from various archaeological sites in Upper Mesopotamia (none of which dated to the Ubaid period) provides some evidence for genetic links with other regions, but also provides evidence for continuity within Mesopotamia. Most importantly, the dating of genetic influxes that have been detected, has not been refined adequately in order to be assigned to the Ubaid period – or any other period earlier than the one from which the skeletal material came. In other words, this genetic influx could have happened during the Ubaid – or not.

== See also ==
- Art of Mesopotamia
- Kenan Tepe
- Ubaid house
