= Tell el-'Oueili =

Archaeological site in southern Iraq

- Tell el-‘Uwaili
- Location within Iraq
- 31.243°N 45.885°E
- Type: settlement
- Periods: Ubaid
- Location: Iraq
- Region: Dhi Qar Governorate

History
- Built: 6500-5400 BCE
- Abandoned: before 3000 BCE

Site notes
- Height: 5 metres (16 ft)
- Length: 200 metres (660 ft)
- Excavation dates: 1976, 1978, 1981, 1983, 1985, 1987, 1989, 2019, 2021, 2023
- Archaeologists: A. Parrot. J.-L. Huot

Tell el-'Oueili (also Tell el-‘Uwaili and Awayli); Mesopotamian Arabic: تل العويلي, romanized: Təll əl-ʿOwēli is an archaeological site in the ancient Near East, located in Dhi Qar Governorate, southern Iraq. It is located 3.5 kilometers southeast of the ancient site of Larsa. The site was excavated between 1976 and 1989 by French archaeologists under the direction of Jean-Louis Huot.

The excavations have revealed occupation layers predating those of Eridu, making Tell el-'Oueili the earliest known Ubaid settlement in Lower Mesopotamia. Older sites possibly exist, being buried under alluvium and submerged due to the movement of the Persian Gulf.

As such, Tell el-'Oueili remains notable as the culture of this particular settlement came to eclipse other in light of the northward Ubaid expansion. Later, the Ubaid would evolve into the Uruk period, which introduced proto-writing and the state concept.

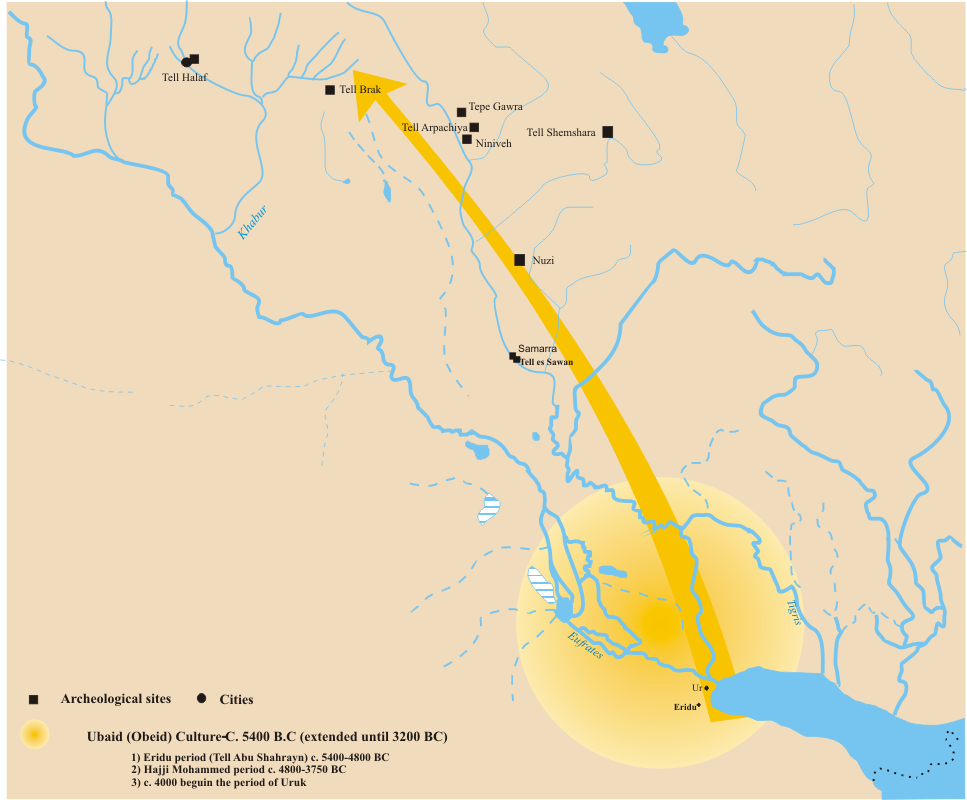
The northward Ubaid expansion

== History of research ==
The site was first noted and surveyed by French scholar André Parrot, who at the time was working at nearby Larsa. Two small excavation seasons took place in 1976 and 1978, and regular excavations commenced in 1981. Four more seasons took place in every uneven year until 1989. All excavations were directed by French archaeologist Jean-Louis Huot.

After a long hiatus archaeological work has resumed at the site with excavations in 2019, 2021, and 2023.

At the eastern mound where Uruk period remains had earlier been noted, a number of beveled rim bowls were found.

== Tell el-'Oueili and its environment ==
The site measures 200 metres (660 ft) in diameter and is approximately 5 metres (16 ft) high. The environment of 'Oueili is characterized by temperatures that can reach more than 50 °C (122 °F) in summer and less than 250 mm of annual rainfall, making the area unsuitable for rainfed agriculture.

== Occupation history ==
Tell el-'Oueili was occupied during the Ubaid period. The excavations have revealed occupation layers dating from Ubaid 0 (6500-5400 BCE) to Ubaid 4. The phase Ubaid 0 was first discovered at this site and was hence provisionally termed 'Oueili-phase. A surface survey showed that the site was occupied into the Uruk Period.

== See also ==
- History of Mesopotamia
- Cities of the ancient Near East
