= Dosariyah =

Archaeological site in Eastern Province, Saudi Arabia

- Dawsariyyah, Dosarije
- Location within Saudi Arabia
- 26.877°N 49.818°E
- Periods: Neolithic
- Location: Jubail
- Region: Eastern Province

Site notes
- Excavation dates: 1972; 2010-present
- Archaeologists: G. Burkholder; H. Masry; P. Drechsler
- Public access: No

Dosariyah is an archeological site in the Eastern Province, Saudi Arabia, dating to the late 6th and early 5th millennium BCE. The spectrum of archaeological remains relate the site to the Arabian Neolithic. The earliest samples of Ubaid style pottery in Saudi Arabia were found at Dosariyah.

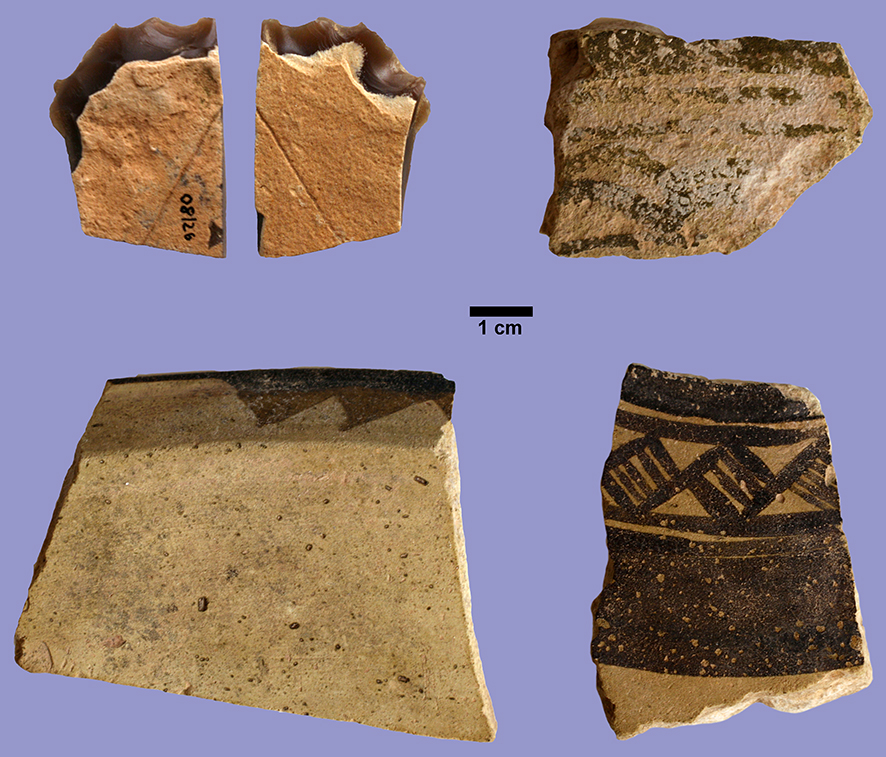
Ubaid-style pottery and stone tool

== Location ==
The site is located about 12 km south of Jubail and 800 m inland from the present coastline of the Persian Gulf. Today it represents an approximately north–south orientated flat hill elevating about 2 m above the regular ground without a direct line of sight on the Persian Gulf. Southwards lies the Sabkha as-Summ. The surrounding area is dominated by dunes and sparse vegetation.

== Discovery ==
Grace Burkholder first discovered Dosariyah in 1968. Scattered all over the area she found great amounts of painted and unpainted pieces of pottery, stone tools made from Silex and Obsidian, seashells, and bones of mammals and fish as well as plaster. In the same year, Geoffrey Bibby dated the pottery to the Ubaid period and suggested further investigation on the site. In 1972 Abdullah H. Masry proofed at least 7 layers containing settlement debris to a depth of 2.50 m, separated by layers with only few finds. After these first excavations a massive fence was built around the site to protect it. Since 2010 a joint Saudi-German team from the Dammam Regional Museum and the University of Tübingen is re-excavating Dosariyah.

== Dating ==
The range of findings as well as the stratigraphy date the main time of Dosariyah's habitation to the Arabian Neolithic and the Ubaid period. Radiocarbon dates from shells verify this assumption, dating to the late 6th and the early 5th millennium BC. Except a single potsherd from the Islamic Period and modern debris found on the surface there are no indicators for later settlements at this site. The good preservation of organic material makes Dosariyah an excellent example for the investigation of the Neolithic on the Arabian Peninsula.

== Pottery and function of the settlement ==
The findings of Dosariyah contain elements of the local Arabic Neolithic as well as influences from southern Mesopotamia. Especially the large amount of imported Ubaid style pottery from southern Mesopotamia suggests intense cultural contacts. About 25% of Dosariyah's pottery is tempered with straw and minerals. This, therefore called “Coarseware”, is seen as a local pottery tradition. Ubaid style pottery is found at various sites along the southern coast of the Persian Gulf. Even though many of these sites contain only few Ubaid style sherds the great deal of imported pottery and obsidian at Dosariyah suggests its relevance within an extensive social and economic network. Several, up to 50 cm thick layers containing mostly shells of pearl oyster Pinctada radiata could be seen as evidence for pearling. If Dosariyah was a permanently inhabited settlement or a periodically used encampment established by herding nomads for trading, fishery etc. is object of the current investigations.

== Obsidian trade ==
In Dosariyah, nine samples of Ubaid-associated obsidian were analyzed. They came from eastern and northeastern Anatolia, such as from Pasinler, Erzurum, as well as from Armenia. The obsidian was in the form of finished blade fragments.

== See also ==
- Sabiyah
