= Ain Qannas =

Archaeological site

- عين قناص (Arabic)
- Ein Ganas
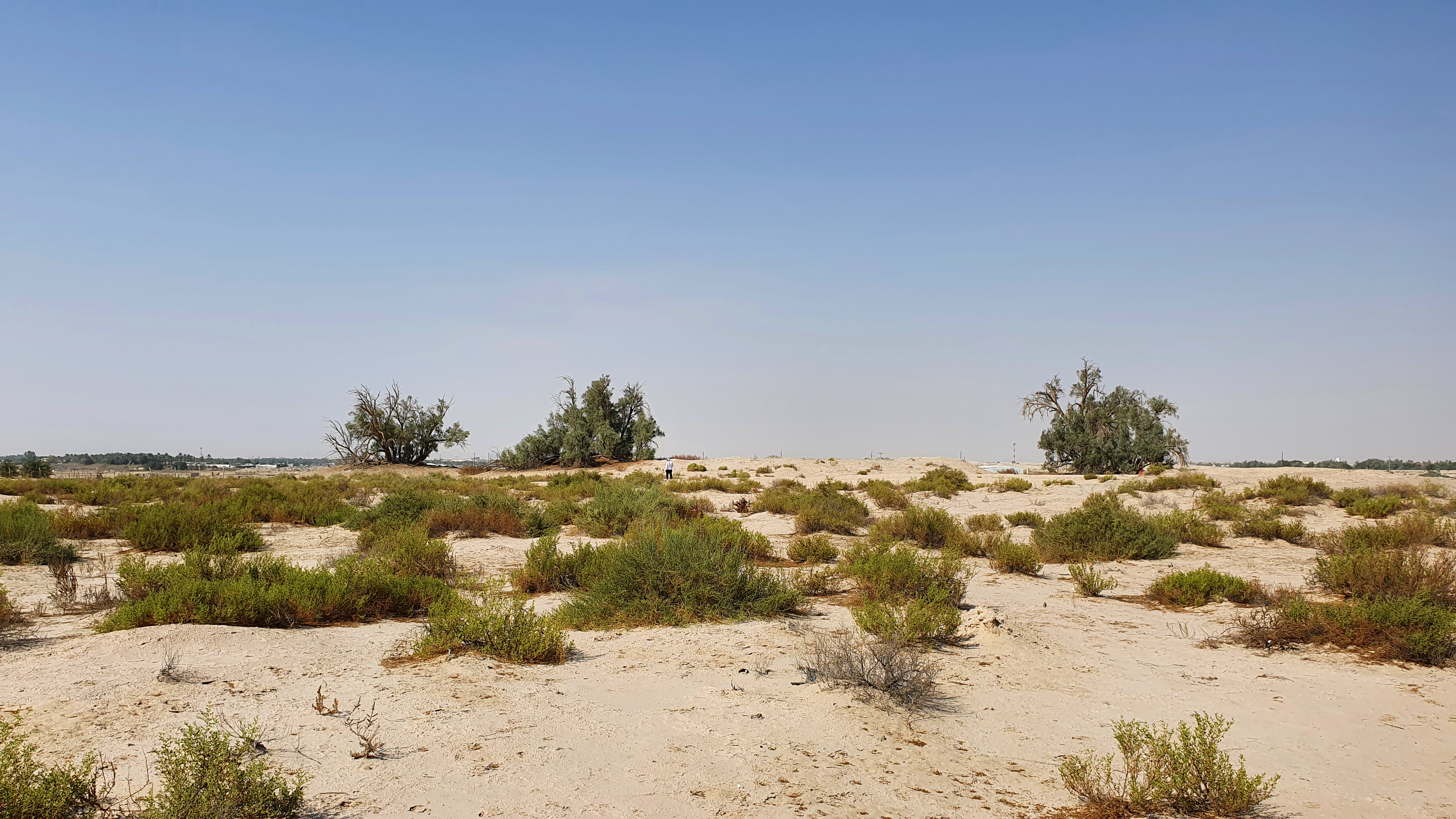
- Ain Qannas
- Interactive map of Ain Qannas
- Type: Archaeological site
- Periods: Neolithic (late 6th–early 5th millennium BCE)
- Cultures: Ubaid
- Location: Near Al-Murah village, Al-Hasa, Eastern Province, Saudi Arabia

Site notes
- Height: 4 m (13 ft)
- Diameter: 250 m (820 ft)

Ain Qannas or Ein Ganas is an archaeological site located near Al-Murah village in Al-Hasa, Eastern Saudi Arabia. It dates to between the late 6th to early 5th millennium BCE. The site is related to Ubaid period, which is Arabian Neolithic period.

== Description ==
The site is approximately 60 kilometres (37 mi) from the coast, at the time it was located by the shores of a lake. The site is at a mound 4 m (13 ft) high and 250 m (820 ft) across. Unlike most eastern Arabian Neolithic sites, which are small and unstratified, Ain Qannas is one of the region’s larger mound sites with deep archaeological deposits. Excavations revealed fourteen successive occupation layers. The earliest settlement consisted of circular houses and huts built from palm fronds and reeds around an ancient spring, with adjoining structures used for keeping animals. The stratigraphy indicated abrupt climatic fluctuation with moist and dry periods alternating. In upper stratigraphic levels, fragments of pottery have been found; there is also evidence of hunting equids and herding of goats and cattle. Blade-type tools with projectile points and scrapers have also been found.

By the end of Ubaid period, before 5,550 years ago, the civilized era began in Mesopotamia where commercial and cultural contacts between the civilizations around the Persian Gulf has thrived.
