= Choga Mami =

Samarran settlement site in Iraq

- Location within Iraq
- 33.883330°N 45.449990°E
- Type: Settlement
- Location: Diyala, Iraq
- Region: Mandali region

History
- Built: c. 5600 BC
- Abandoned: c. 4800 BC

Site notes
- Material: Mud brick
- Excavation dates: 1967-1968
- Archaeologists: Joan and David Oates
- Discovered: 1967

Choga Mami was a Samarran settlement site in Diyala in Eastern Iraq in the Mandali region. It shows the first canal irrigation in operation around 6000 BCE.

The site, about 70 miles northeast of Baghdad, has been dated to the late 6th millennium BCE. It was occupied in several phases from the Samarran culture through the Ubaid. Buildings were rectangular and built of mud brick, including a guard tower at the settlement's entrance. Irrigation supported livestock (cattle, sheep and goats) and arable (wheat, barley and flax) agriculture.

One important aspect of the site therefore is the evidence that it yields for chronological relationships between North and South Mesopotamian cultures, at least in the area of Mandali, and for connections with Iran. The introduction of irrigation, new types of grain, foreign ceramic styles and domestic cattle are all located in the Choga Mami phase, a late manifestation of the Samarran Period in lowland Mesopotamia. This chronological identification thus also suggests the source of these innovations: migration from the lowlands.

Artifacts found at Choga Mami include Samarran painted pottery and elaborate clay female figurines.

== History ==
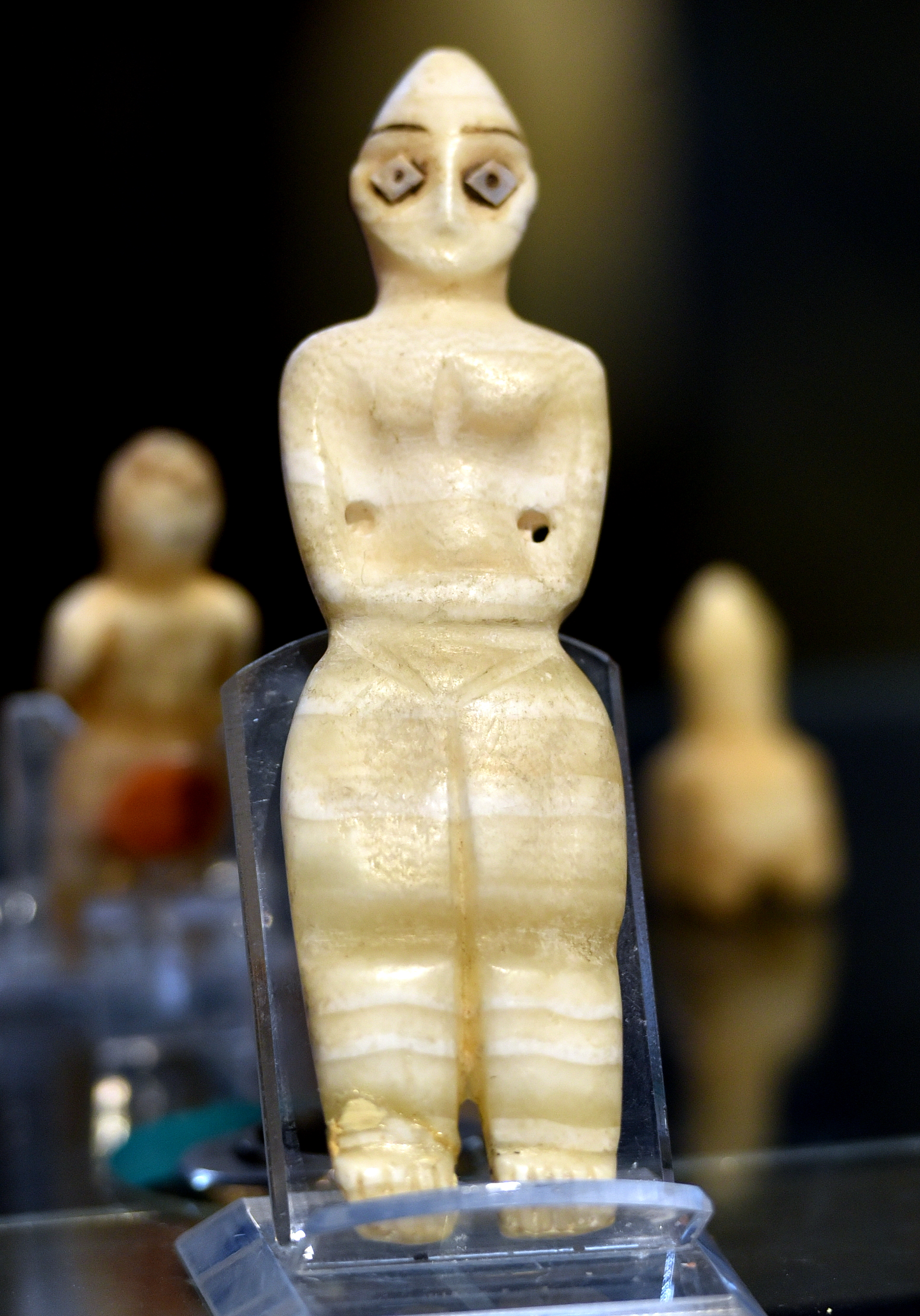
Samarra culture figurine from Tell es-Sawwan, Iraq. Marble. The eyes are inlaid with shells set in bitumen. 6000-5800 BC Iraq Museum.

Choga Mami is the largest Tell in the Mandali region. Excavators David and Joan Oates describe the site as a "low mound some 200 meters long and 2-5 meters high," and "heavily eroded, the latest preserved levels dating to 4800 B.C." Based on excavation findings, it appears that Choga Mami had a few small village clusters with small irrigated areas where people grew wheat and barley; herded sheep, goats and some cows; and hunted gazelles and other wild fauna. Lentils and "large-seeded peas" were also grown, while pistachios were gathered from the nearby landscape. The domestication of plants and animals at Choga Mami was possible because of man-made irrigation channels which "ran along the northern side of the mound," which date from the "6th millennium B.C.," and a large canal dating to the end of the Samarran period which was located at the "southwestern side of the mound." Some channels reached more than five kilometers in length, which would require the cooperative labor of larger groups. The latest of these canals can be dated to around 1,500 years ago.

== Archaeology ==
Choga Mami was originally excavated by a team of archaeologists, led by Joan and David Oates. The first season of this excavation project began on December 2, 1967 and would extend until February 26, 1968. The archaeological site of Choga Mami was chosen for excavation in part due to its location in Iraq, along an area which would have ostensibly seen heavy foot traffic during the time, in which it would have been considered part of the Mesopotamian region. During the excavation the team of archaeologists found mud brick rooms all similar in size and thoughtfully aligned, pottery, tools, and many small clay figures. David Oates also found a jar containing the fragmented remains of what is presumably an infant burial, which led them to believe that this location would have been the site of a small town.

== Architecture ==
Excavations at Choga Mami have revealed many levels of occupation on the tell, dating from the start of the 6th millennium BC. A mud-brick tower guarded the entrance to the settlement. There is no clear evidence that it formed part of a town wall, and encouraged by a part of an ascending ramp found beside it, archaeologists identify the structure as a watch tower. Built out of locally sourced mud brick, the settlement had Samarran-style, rectangular shaped homes. The homes found at Choga Mami were built directly on top of, or occasionally within, the walls of earlier levels. The majority of houses "contained either two or three rows of small rooms," on either side of a central hall, referred to as a tripartite plan. This plan is common throughout Mesopotamia in both public and domestic architecture. Many of the houses found at Choga Mami were strengthened by external buttresses, corresponding with "the corners and junctions of walls." The largest house found by excavators measured 10 x 7 meters and contained twelve rooms in three rows. Despite being rendered obsolete by architectural innovations later in the period, these buttresses are found at all levels of occupation, resulting in purely decorative use of the buttress by the end of the Samarran period.

== Ceramics/Pottery ==
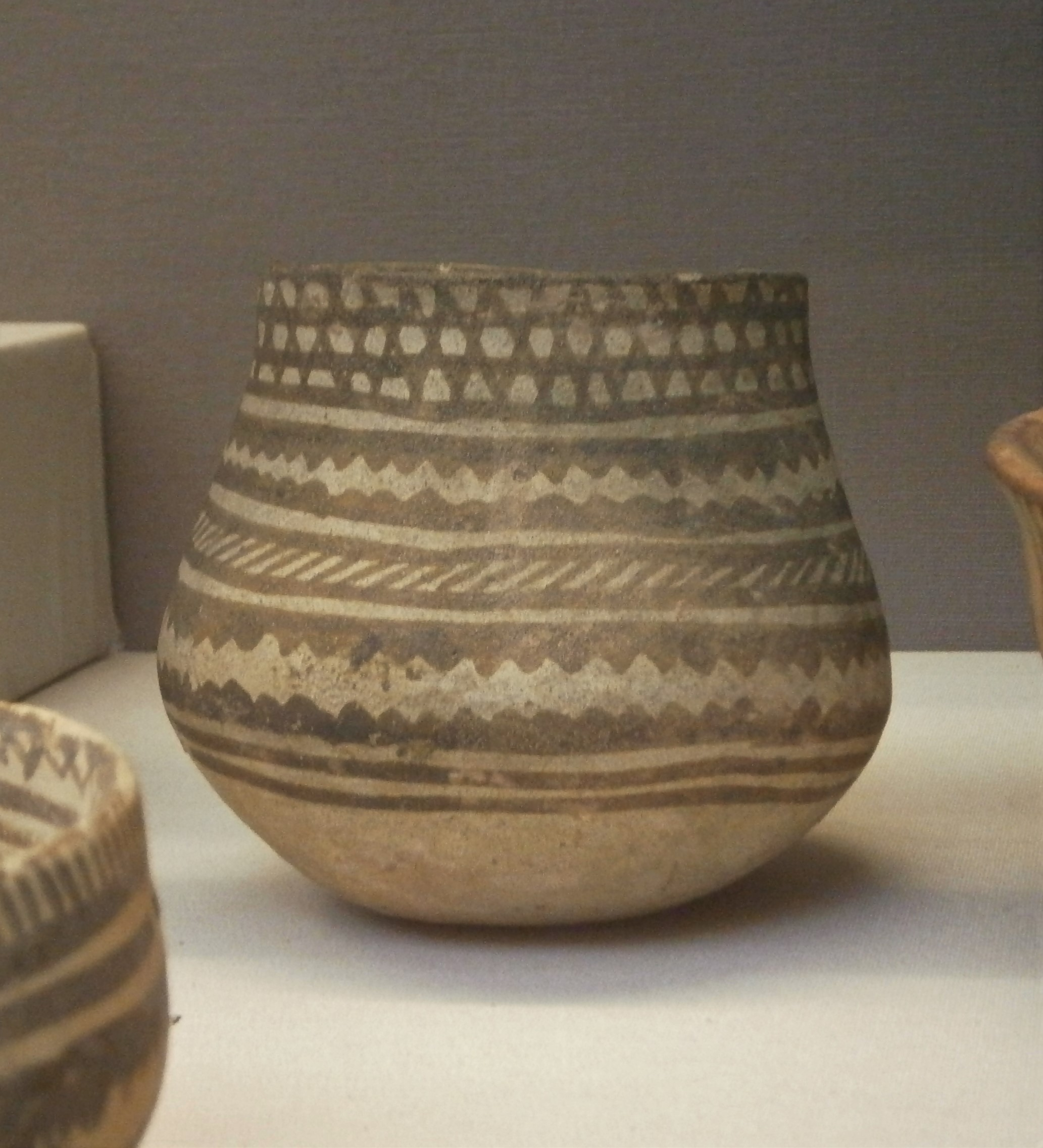
Painted jar, Samarra culture c. 6250, from Samarra. British Museum.

The surviving pieces of pottery found at Choga Mami were regularly constructed with the same materials and the same overall look as those of the wider Samarran culture. Many remaining examples display an extensive use of animal imagery, a defining characteristic of the period. Among the clay artifacts that have been excavated at Choga Mami, both painted and unpainted pots, clay beads, and small figurines have been recovered. While standing male and female Terracotta figurines are the most common, other figurines largely resemble the figures of the later Ubaid period, found in southern Iraq. These small baked terracotta figurines are often depicted as standing male or female statutes with their hands at their waist and intricately decorated, yet depicted with exaggerated body proportions. Many have the appliqué eyes, scalloped hairstyles and beauty marks, typical of the pottery of the larger Mandali region. Few Terracotta figurines have been found fully intact due to their composition. Most remain fragmentary, as these figurines were often assembled with added on smaller pieces, which have broken off over time at the joining point.

== See also ==
- Jawa Dam, Jordan
- Samarran culture
- Joan Oates
- David Oates

== Bibliography ==
- Andrianov, Boris Vasilʹevich, et al (2016), Ancient irrigation systems of the Aral Sea area: the history, origin, and development of irrigated agriculture. (American School of Prehistoric Research).
- Garfinkel, Yosef (2003), “The Earliest Dancing Scenes in the Near East.” Near Eastern Archaeology, vol. 66, no. 3, 2003, pp. 84–95., doi:10.2307/3210910.
- Garfinkel, Yosef (2000), “The Khazineh Painted Style of Western Iran.” Iran, vol. 38, 2000, pp. 57–70., doi:10.2307/4300582.
- Helbaek, Hans (1972), “Samarran Irrigation Agriculture at Choga Mami in Iraq.” Iraq, vol. 34, no. 1, 1972, pp. 35–48., doi:10.2307/4199929.
- Huot, Jean-Louis (1992), “The First Farmers at Oueili.” The Biblical Archaeologist, vol. 55, no. 4, 1992, pp. 188–195., doi:10.2307/3210313.
- Jasim, Sabah Abboud (1983), “Excavations at Tell Abada a Preliminary Report.” Iraq, vol. 45, no. 2, 1983, pp. 165–185., doi:10.2307/4200200.
- McDonald, M. (n.d.), Chalocolithic Choga Mami. Retrieved November 25, 2017, from http://ancientneareast.tripod.com/Choga_Mami.html
- Mortensen, Peder (1973), “A Sequence of Samarran Flint and Obsidian Tools from Choga Mami.” Iraq, vol. 35, no. 1, 1973, pp. 37–55., doi:10.2307/4199950.
- Oates, David., “Excavations at Choga Mami, Iraq.” University of Chicago Press, found here.
- Oates, David and Joan (1976), The Rise of Civilization. (New York: Elsevier Phaidon).
- Oates, Joan (1972), “A Radiocarbon Date from Choga Mami.” Iraq, vol. 34, no. 1, 1972, pp. 49–53., doi:10.2307/4199930.
- Oates, Joan (1969), “Choga Mami, 1967-68: A Preliminary Report.” Iraq, vol. 31, no. 2, 1969, pp. 115–152., doi:10.2307/4199877.
- Oates, Joan (1978), “Religion and Ritual in Sixth-Millenium B.C. Mesopotamia.” World Archaeology, vol. qo, no. 2, 1978, pp. 117–124.
- Oates, Joan (1968), “Prehistoric Investigations near Mandali, Iraq.” Iraq, vol. 30, no. 1, 1968, pp. 1–20.
- Oates, Joan (1969), “Choga Mami, 1967-68: A Preliminary Report.” Iraq, vol. 31, no. 2, 1969, pp. 115–152., doi:10.2307/4199877.
- Potts, Daniel (1997), "Mesopotamian Civilization: The Material Foundation",(Cornell University Press, Ithaca, New York).
- Yoffee, Norman and Clark, Jeffery J. (eds) (1993), "Early Stages in the Evolution of Mesopotamian Civilization: Soviet Excavations in Northern Iraq", (The University of Arizona Press, Tucson)
- Young, R., and H. Fazeli(2008), “Interpreting Animal Bones in Iran: Considering New Animal Bone Assemblages from Three Sites in the Qazvin Plain within a Broader Geographical and Chronological Perspective.” Paléorient, vol. 34, no. 2, 2008, pp. 153–172., doi:10.3406/paleo.2008.5260.
