= Joan Oates =

American-British archaeologist (1928–2023)

Joan Oates FBA
- Born: Joan Louise Lines; 6 May 1928; Watertown, New York, U.S.
- Died: 3 February 2023 (aged 94)
- Spouse: David Oates (m. 1956–2004)
- Children: Three
- Awards: Fellow of the British Academy (2004); Grahame Clark Medal for Prehistoric Archaeology (2014)

Academic background
- Thesis: The Al 'Ubaid Period in Mesopotamia and Its Persian Affinities (1953)
- Doctoral advisor: Dorothy Garrod and Max Mallowan

Academic work
- Discipline: Archaeology
- Sub-discipline: Ancient Near East
- Institutions: Girton College, Cambridge; University of Cambridge; McDonald Institute for Archaeological Research

Joan Louise Oates, FBA (née Lines; 6 May 1928 – 3 February 2023) was an American-British archaeologist and academic, specialising in the Ancient Near East. From 1971 to 1995 she was a Fellow and tutor of Girton College, Cambridge, and a lecturer at the University of Cambridge. From 1995 she was a Senior Research Fellow of the McDonald Institute for Archaeological Research. From 2004 she was director of the excavations of Tell Brak, having been co-director, with her husband, David Oates, between 1988 and 2004.

== Early life and education ==
Oates was born in Watertown, New York, on 6 May 1928, to Harold Burdette Lines and Beatrice Naomi Lines. She studied chemistry and social anthropology at Syracuse University, graduating with a Bachelor of Arts (BA) degree in 1950.

Having won a Fulbright Scholarship, she went on to undertake postgraduate study at Girton College, Cambridge and the Faculty of Archaeology and Anthropology, University of Cambridge, completing her Doctor of Philosophy (PhD) in 1953. Oates' PhD studies were initially supervised by Dorothy Garrod and later by Max Mallowan. In the course of her studies she visited the British School of Archaeology in Baghdad and travelled with Mallowan to Nimrud. During this time she became acquainted with novelist Agatha Christie, who based the character Sally Finch on her in the novel Hickory Dickory Dock. He doctoral thesis was titled "The Al 'Ubaid Period in Mesopotamia and Its Persian Affinities". She returned to the USA after completing her PhD.

== Academic career ==
Oates began her career as an assistant curator in the Department of Near Eastern Antiquities at the Metropolitan Museum of Art in New York City between 1953 and 1956. In addition, she continued to visit Nimrud with Max Mallowan each year, and was focused on categorising and publishing the pottery from that excavation.

She married David Oates in 1956 and moved permanently to the United Kingdom. They worked together on archaeological excavations in Nimrud, Ain Sinu, Nippur and Choga Mami. The Choga Mami excavation was directed by Joan Oates. After the birth of her children, Oates played a less active role in excavations, but continued to participate by documenting the finds, particularly potsherds. This continued involvement contributed to her securing a Guggenheim Fellowship from 1966 to 1967. In 1968 they left Iraq due to the political instability and returned to Cambridge.

In 1971, Joan Oates was elected a fellow of Girton College, Cambridge and Director of Studies in both Oriental Studies and Archaeology at that college, becoming a Senior Research Fellow in 1989. She carried out excavations at Tell Brak in Syria 14 times between 1971 and 1993 and continuing to visit the site after her retirement. She was co-director with her husband David of the excavations at Tell Brak from 1988 to 2004, and became its sole director after his death in 2004. In 1988 she was a Visiting Scholar at the Smithsonian in Washington DC, and in 1989 she became a lecturer in the history and archaeology of the Ancient Near East at the University of Cambridge.

Her many valuable contributions to archaeology include establishing that the origins of Tell Brak were 1000 years earlier than previously thought and identifying a previously unknown stage in the development of writing.

In 1995 she retired and was made a Life Fellow of Girton. She was a Senior Fellow of the McDonald Institute for Archaeological Research at Cambridge from 1995.

== Personal life ==
While she was participating in the excavation of Nimrud, she met David Oates (1927–2004). They married in 1956 and had three children. They collaborated on a number of archaeological publications and excavations.

Joan Oates died on 3 February 2023, at the age of 94. Her funeral was held in Girton College Chapel on 23 February 2023.

== Honours ==
In 1991 Oates was awarded the Arents Award by Syracuse University, bestowed on the most distinguished alumni who have made extraordinary achievements. In 2004 Oates was elected a Fellow of the British Academy (FBA). In 2014 she was awarded the Grahame Clark Medal for Prehistoric Archaeology by the British Academy.

== Selected works ==
- David Oates and Joan Oates, The Rise of Civilization, Oxford: Elsevier 1976. ISBN 072900015X.
- Joan Oates, Babylon, New York: Thames & Hudson, revised ed. 1986. ISBN 0500273847.
- Joan Oates, Carolyn Postgate and David Oates, The Excavations at Tell al Rimah: The Pottery, Warminster: British School of Archaeology in Iraq 1997. ISBN 0856687006.
- David Oates, Joan Oates and Helen McDonald, Excavations at Tell Brak, Volume 1, The Mitanni and Old Babylonian Periods, Cambridge: McDonald Institute for Archaeological Research 1998. ISBN 0951942050.
- David Oates, Joan Oates and Helen McDonald, Excavations at Tell Brak, Volume 2, Nagar in the Third Millennium BC, Cambridge: McDonald Institute for Archaeological Research 2001. ISBN 9780951942093.
- Joan Oates and David Oates, Nimrud: An Assyrian Imperial City Revealed, London: British School of Archaeology in Iraq 2001. ISBN 0903472252.
