= Wali Dewane =

Kurdish poet

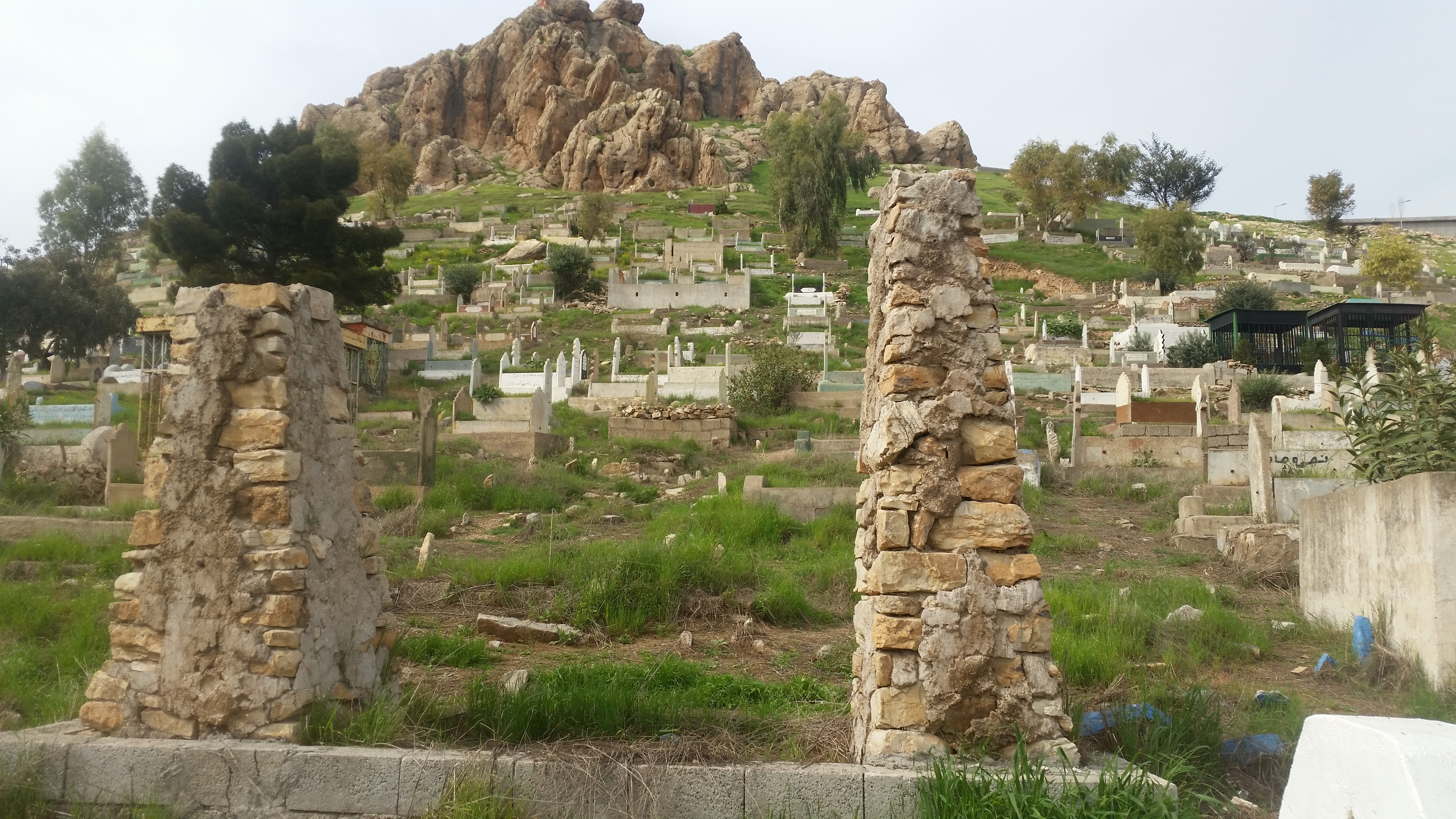
- Grave of Wali Dewane in Said Sadiq, Iraqi Kurdistan
- Born: 1826; Halabja, Bakr Awa
- Died: 1886 (aged 59–60); Saidsadiq
- Occupation: Poet

Walid Kewikha Muhammed, also known as Wali Dewane (Kurdish: وەلی دێوانە, 1826–1881) was a Kurdish poet. Dewane was born in Said Sadiq city.
