= Shahrizor =

Plain in Iraqi Kurdistan

Shahrizor شارەزوور
- Plain
- Etymology: Likely derived from Iranian words "shah" (king) and "razur" (forest), meaning "kingly forest" or "royal forest."
- Interactive map of Shahrizor
- Coordinates: 35.45°N 45.45°E
- Country: Iraq
- Region: Kurdistan Region
- Governorate: Sulaymaniyah Governorate

Shahrizor or Shahrezur (Kurdish: شارەزوور, romanized: Şarezûr) is a fertile plain in the Kurdistan Region of Iraq, situated in the Silêmanî Governorate and west of Hewraman. Shahrizor plain is watered by the tributaries of Tanjaro river which flows to Diyala and Tigris rivers.

== Etymology ==
The name Shahrazur is likely derived from two Iranian words: shah (king) and razur (forest), hence sharazur meaning kingly forest (royal forest). Herzfeld based on the fact that in classical sources the name was spelt with an initial /s/ rather /sh/, suggested white forest, which he connected with the Avestan legends. Indeed, to this day the plain of Sharazur has an important status among adherents of native religion of Yarsan as a holy and sacred region where God descends for the Last Judgement. The 12th century geographer Yaqut al-Hamawi, based on folk etymology interpreted origin of name Sharazur, from the name of the son of Zahhak, whom he mentions as founder of the famous city of Sharazor.

== History ==
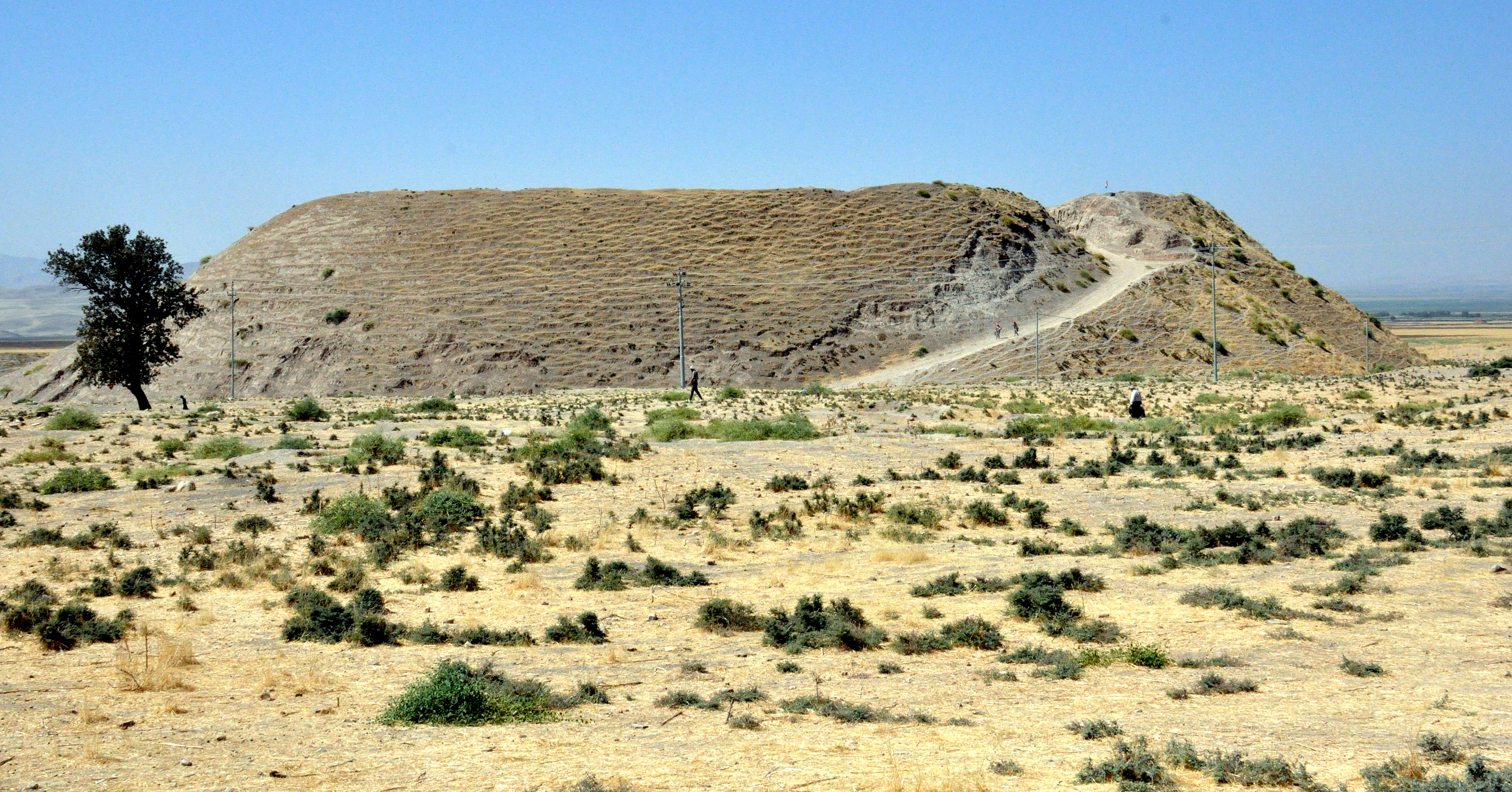
The ancient mound of Bakr Awa, September 18, 2014

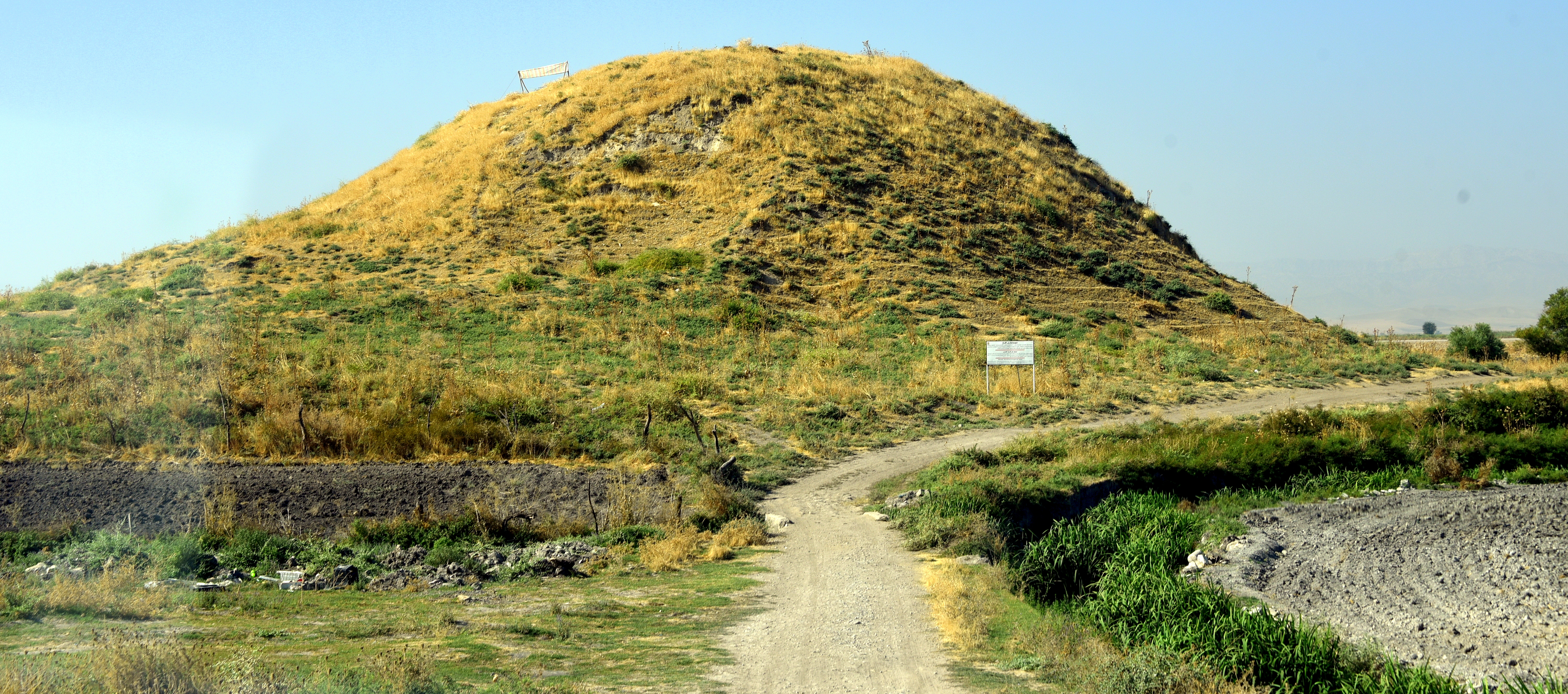
The ancient mound of Gird-î Qalrakh, September 11, 2016

Human occupation in the Shahrizor valley goes back to the prehistoric times, and the plain has been continuously occupied since then. Shahrizor Survey Project has shown that Shahrizor valley was already inhabited during the Late Neolithic and Chalcolithic periods. The Halaf culture, and the Chalcolithic Ubaid culture have been attested here. This has been shown by extensive archaeological research, especially since 2009, at sites like Bakr Awa, Tell Begum, Gird-î Qalrakh, and Bestansur (which is on the UNESCO World Heritage Tentative List)

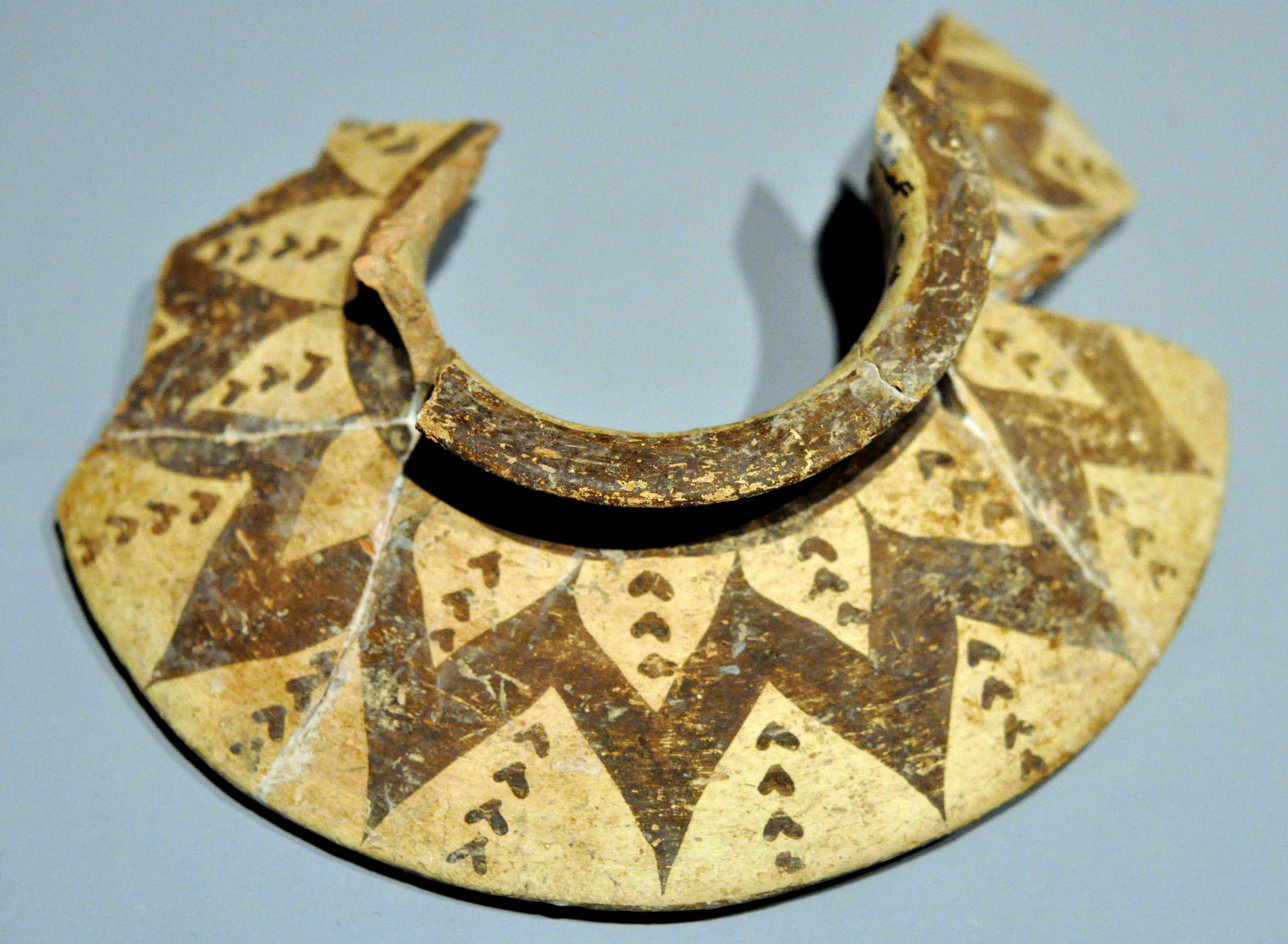
Painted pottery, Jemdet Nasr period, c. 3000 BCE. From Greza, Shahrizor Plain, Sulaymaniyah, Iraq. Sulaymaniyah Museum, Iraqi Kurdistan

Sites like Bakr Awa show that there was also occupation here during the Akkadian Empire period.

During the 3rd millennium BC, Shahrizor plain belonged to the kingdom of Lullubi.

During the Iron Age it was part of the Zamua kingdom, which stretched from Lake Urmia to the upper reaches of the Diyala River, roughly corresponding with the modern Sulaimania governorate (still called Zamua/Zamwa) in Iraqi Kurdistan. It was centered at Sharazur plain. During the rule of the Neo-Assyrian king Assurnasirbal II, the region was rebellious, and had to be subdued.

Arabs associated Shahrizor with biblical legends associated with Saul and David suggesting that the region had a Jewish colony.

Sharazor and its king Yazdan Kurd are mentioned in the Karnamag, a book of Persian mythology, of Ardashir I and also in the inscription of Narseh alongside Garmian. During the Sassanid era the region of Sharazor was one of the 5 provinces of the satrapy of Medes, an ancient Iranian people.

In the 4th century, some of inhabitants of Sharazor who had converted to Christianity were persecuted by the Sassanids. Among the prominent examples of this persecution is the killing of Bishop Shahdost Shahrazori and 128 of his followers.

Sharazur was incorporated into Ardalan Principality from 11th century until the 16th and was its first capital. Its relics are the historic site of Yassin tepe. It formed afterwards part of Baban Principality.

It was also a center of Zaydism among the Zaydi Kurdish minority, before the eventual decline of Zaydism.

In the Medieval era, the area was incorporated into the territories ruled by many dynasties, including Annazid, Aishanid and also Ayyubid, who were also of Kurdish origins. During the Ayyubid period the region, and the city of Erbil, were granted as a fief to the emir Gökböri by Saladin in 1190.

Yaqut al-Hamawi describes the region of Sharazor as areas between Erbil to the west and Hamadan to the east including many cities, towns and villages. He mentions the inhabitants of the region as having been entirely Kurds, who were defended themselves from the Sultan and ruled their area.

== See also ==
- Al-Shahrazuri – 13th-century physician, historian and philosopher
- Khâlid-i Shahrazuri
- Sharazoor District
- Sulaymaniyah Governorate
