= Tell Begum =

Archaeological site in Iraq

- Gird-i Begum
- Location within Iraq Location within Near East
- 35°17′51″N 45°53′05″E
- Periods: Halaf, Late Chalcolithic, Early Bronze age
- Location: Sulaymaniyah Governorate, Iraq

Site notes
- Area: 5 ha (12 acres)
- Excavation dates: 1960, 2013, 2022
- Archaeologists: Muhammed Ali Mustafa, Olivier Nieuwenhuyse

Tell Begum (also Gird-i Begum) is a tell, or archaeological settlement mound, in Iraq. It is located near Said Sadiq in the Shahrizor Plain in the Sulaymaniyah Governorate of Iraqi Kurdistan.

== Archaeology ==
The site] consists of a steep conical Upper Mound about 20 meters high and an elongated Lower Mound. Overall the site covers an area of hectares. The site was first investigated in 1960 by a team of Iraqi archaeologists led by Muhammed Ali Mustafa, prompted by construction of the Darbandikhan Dam. Work consisted of a step trench on the Upper Mound and a sondage on the Lower Mound. Results of the excavation were not published. After a surface survey in 2012 (as part of the Shahrizor Survey Project) a new excavation was carried out in 2013 by archaeologists from Leiden University. This project reopened the older excavations and also conducted limited new excavations. Three charcoal samples were collected from the Halaf layer (2.2–3.2 meters below the surface, Lower Town) and produced radiocarbon dates (calibration - INTCAL20) of 5481–5329 BC, 5387–5215 BC, and 5479–5307 BC. In 2017 a geomagnetic survey was performed on 4 of the sites in the Tell Begum Cluster, north, northeast and south of Tell Begum. THe northern site was shown to be an Early Bronze Age settlement. In 2022 excavations were conducted by the Freie Universität Berlin. Finds included beveled rim bowls, diagnostic pottery of the Uruk period.

== History ==
The oldest excavated layers date to Late Halaf period. At that time there was a number of small settlements in the area around Tell Begum. Together with the Main Mound and Lower Mound this is call the Tell Begum cluster. (After an apparent hiatus in occupation during the Ubaid period, the site was resettled in the Late Chalcolithic 1 (LC1) period and continued to be in use into the Late Chalcolithic 3 (LC3) period (4300-3600 BC). Late Bronze Age, Iron Age/Achaemenid and Medieval occupation has also been attested. Though no Ubaid period occupational remains were found, pottery sherd finds indicated that Ubaid occupation may lay deeper in the Upper Mound layers as yet unexcavated.

== See also ==
- Chogha Gavaneh
- Cities of the ancient Near East
- Chronology of the ancient Near East
- Jebel Aruda
- Tell al-Hawa
- Grai Resh
