= Said Sadiq =

City in Kurdistan, Iraq

Said Sadiq سه‌ید سادق, سيد صادق
- Town
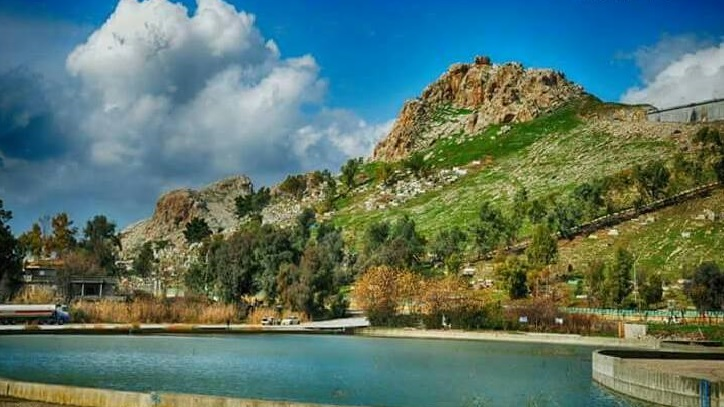
- Interactive map of Said Sadiq
- Location of Said Sadiq in the Kurdistan Region Said Sadiq (Iraqi Kurdistan)
- Coordinates: 35°21′13″N 45°52′00″E
- Country: Iraq
- Region: Kurdistan Region
- Governorate: Sulaymaniyah Governorate
- District: Saidsadiq District
- Seat: Said Sadiq

Population (2018)
  - Total: 61,600
- Time zone: UTC+3 (AST)

Said Sadiq (Arabic: سيد صادق; Sorani Kurdish: سه‌ید سادق) is a city located in the Sulaymaniyah Governorate within the Kurdistan Region of Iraq. The nearby archaeological site of Tell Begum indicates that the area was inhabited as early as the Late Halaf period.

== Notable people ==
- Wali Dewane (1826–1881), poet
