= Gird-î Qalrakh =

Archaeological site in Iraq

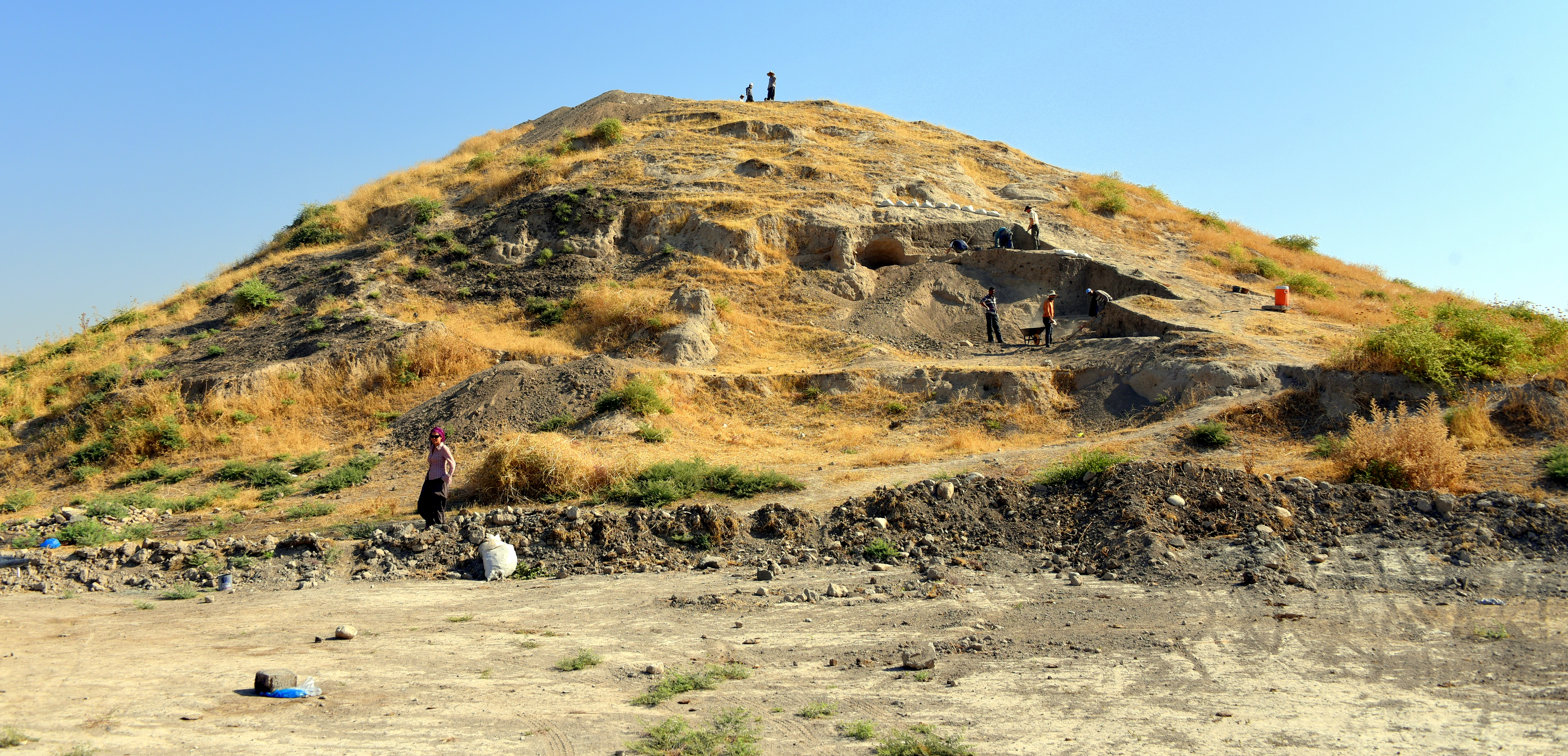
- Type: tell
- Location: Iraq
- Region: Sulaymaniyah Governorate

Site notes
- Height: 26 metre
- Area: 3 hectare
- Excavation dates: 2016; 2017

Gird-î Qalrakh is a tell, or archaeological settlement mound, in the Shahrizor Plain in Iraqi Kurdistan, Iraq. The archaeological site covers an area of 3 hectares according to the excavators; a geomagnetic survey indicated a size of 15 ha. At 26m high, Gird-î Qalrakh has been described as one of the highest mounds in the Shahrizor Plain. Excavations have been carried out in 2016, 2017 and 2019 by a team from the Goethe University Frankfurt. This research showed that the site has been almost continuously occupied from the third millennium BC into the Islamic period. Important discoveries include a substantial stone-built wall from the Neo-Assyrian period, and a well-preserved loom from the Sassanian period. Together with the numerous seals that have been discovered, this suggests that textile production may have been important at Gird-î Qalrakh during this period.

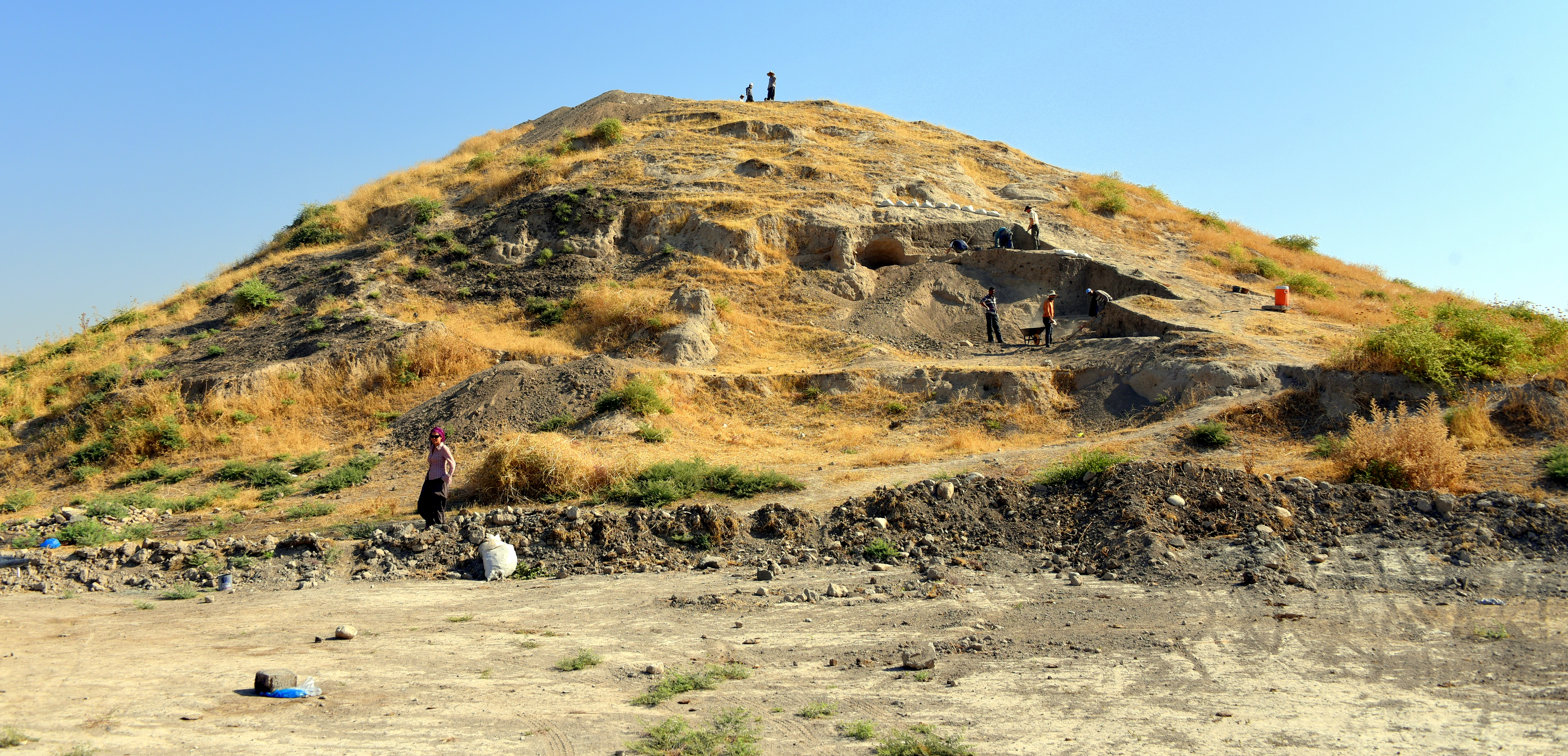
Gird-î Qalrakh, September 11, 2016

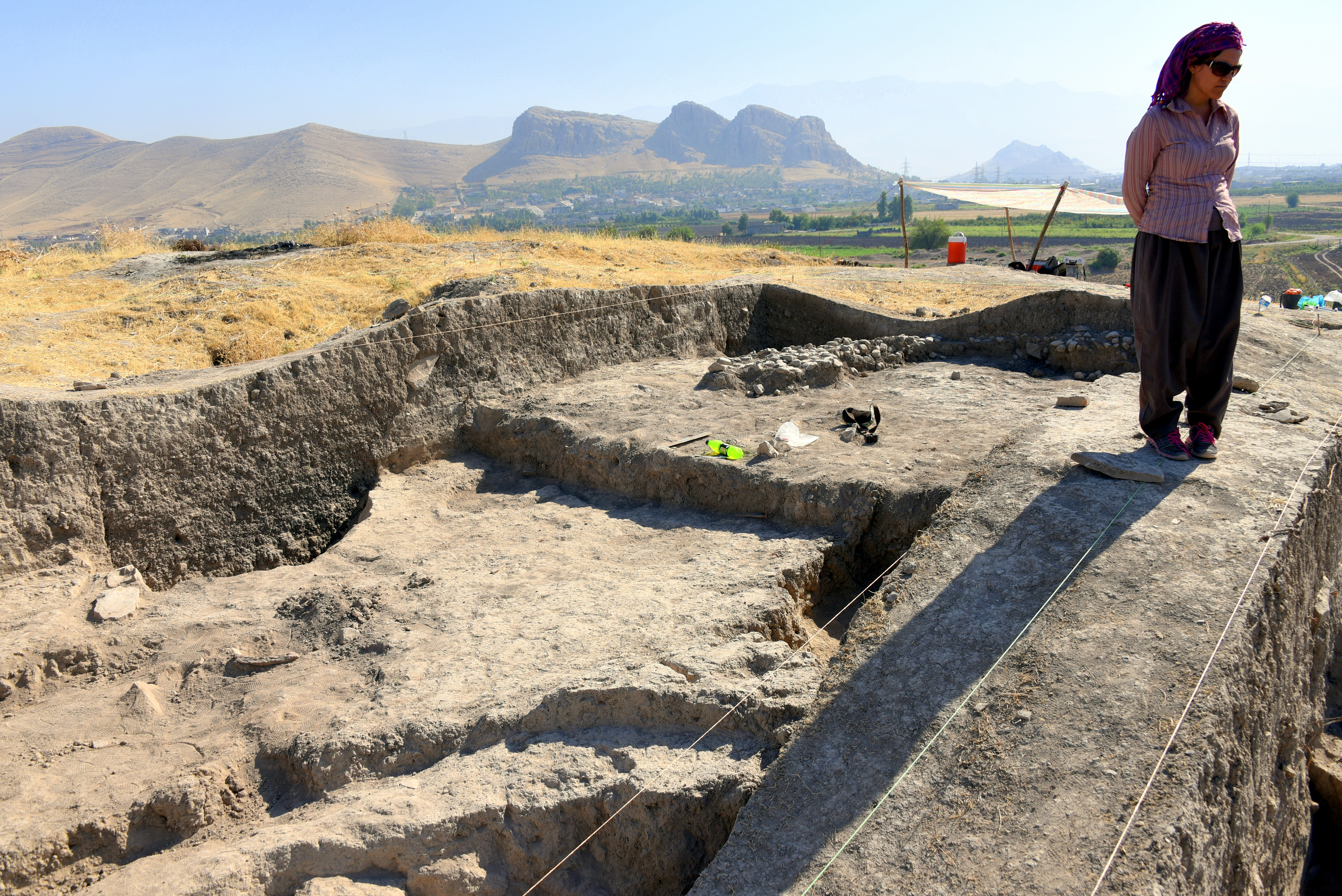
Excavatinons at Gird-i Qalrakh

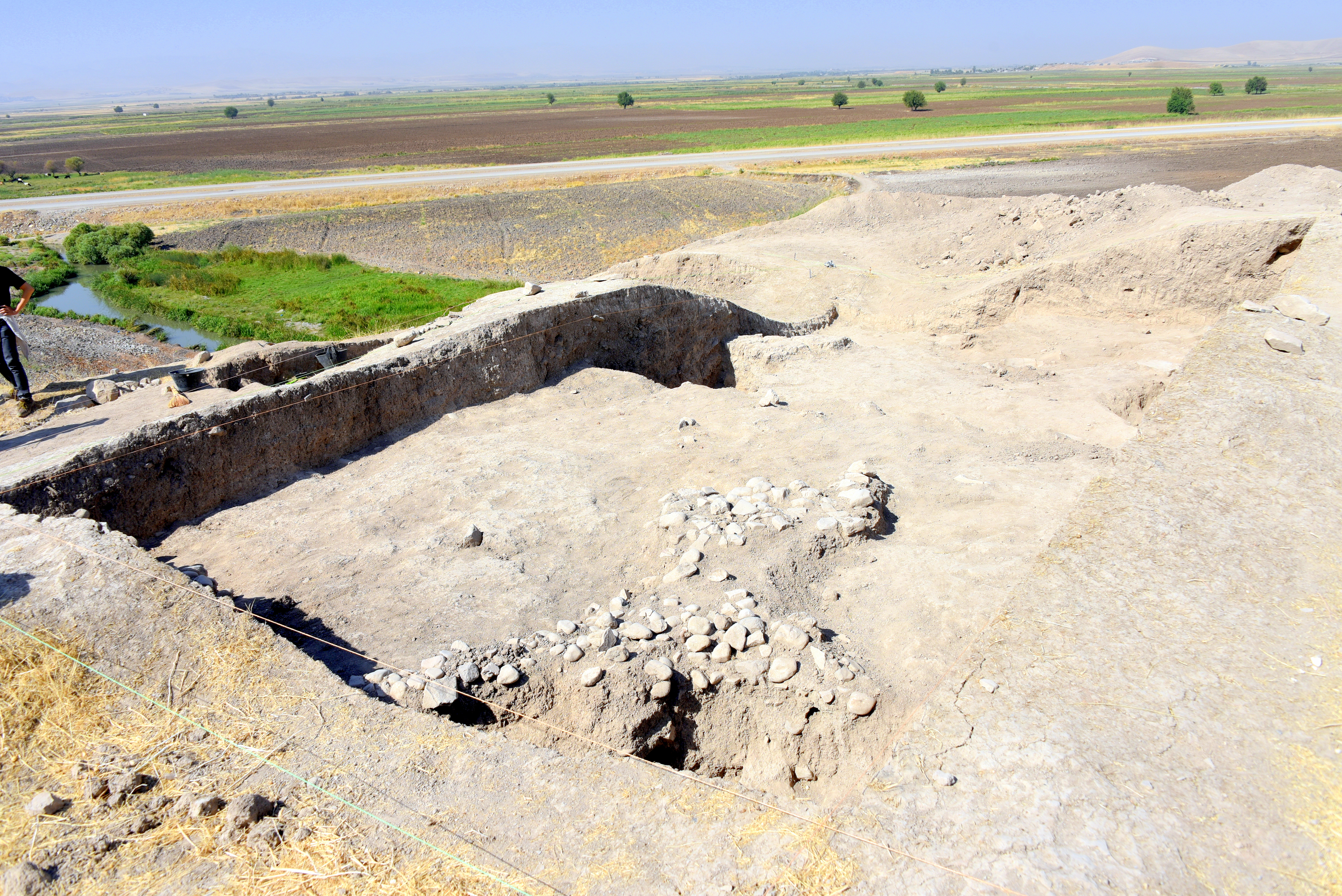
Excavatinons at Gird-i Qalrakh. Shahrizor Plain appears in the background

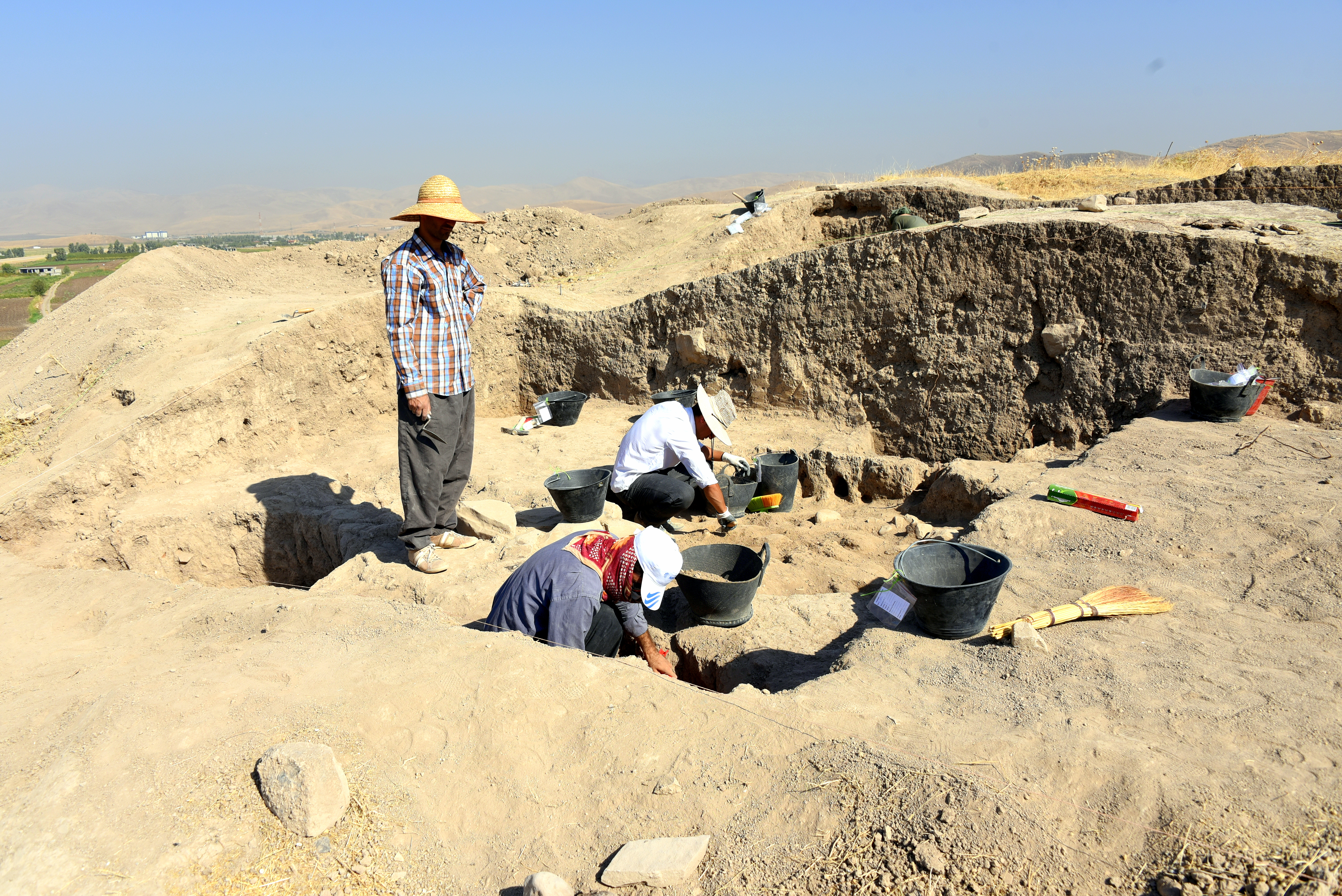
Excavatinons at Gird-i Qalrakh
