= Bakr Awa =

Archaeological mound in Iraq

- Location within Iraq
- 35°13′14″N 45°56′26″E
- Type: tell
- Location: Iraq
- Region: Sulaymaniyah Governorate

Site notes
- Excavation dates: 1927, 1960-1961, 2009-2017
- Archaeologists: Ephraim Avigdor Speiser, Peter A. Miglus

Bakr Awa is a tell, or archaeological settlement mound, in Sulaymaniyah Province, Iraq. It is located near Halabja in the Shahrizor Plain in Iraqi Kurdistan. It is in the foothills of the Zagros Mountains not far from the headwaters of the Diyala River. The site is 40 meters high and consists of a central settlement mound (277 meters by 216 meters) surrounded by a lower city measuring 800 by 600 metres (2,600 ft × 2,000 ft). Other sites in the area include Tell Kunara, Tell Bazmusian, and Tell Shemshara.

== Archaeology ==
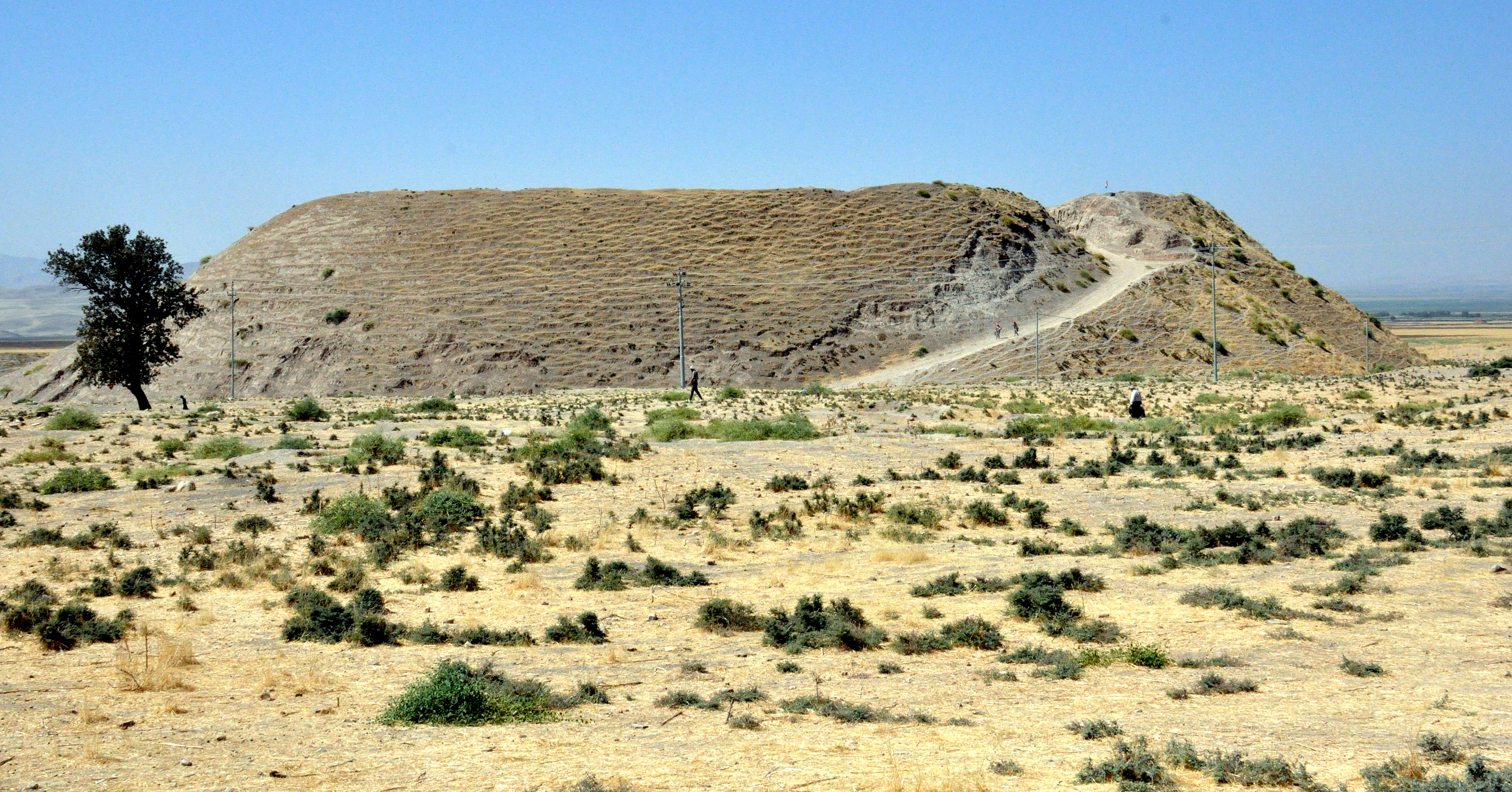
September 18, 2014. The ancient mound of Bakr Awa, Shahrizor Plain, Sulaymaniyah Governorate, Iraq

Bakr Awa was first described by James Felix Jones in 1844. The site was then investigated in 1927 by Ephraim Speiser as part of a more general study of the area. Speiser proposed identifying the site as Atlila, which was subsequently renamed to Dur-Assur.

Subsequent excavations took place in 1960 and 1961 by archaeologists from the Iraqi Directorate-General of Antiquities. The excavators mentioned that they expanded a trench dug by George Martin Lees 40 years before. In 2009 the site was surveyed. New excavations were started in 2010, by which time the site had been subject to heavy looting, and continued until at least 2017. The survey and the 2010-2017 excavations were undertaken by a team from the University of Heidelberg led by Peter A. Miglus.

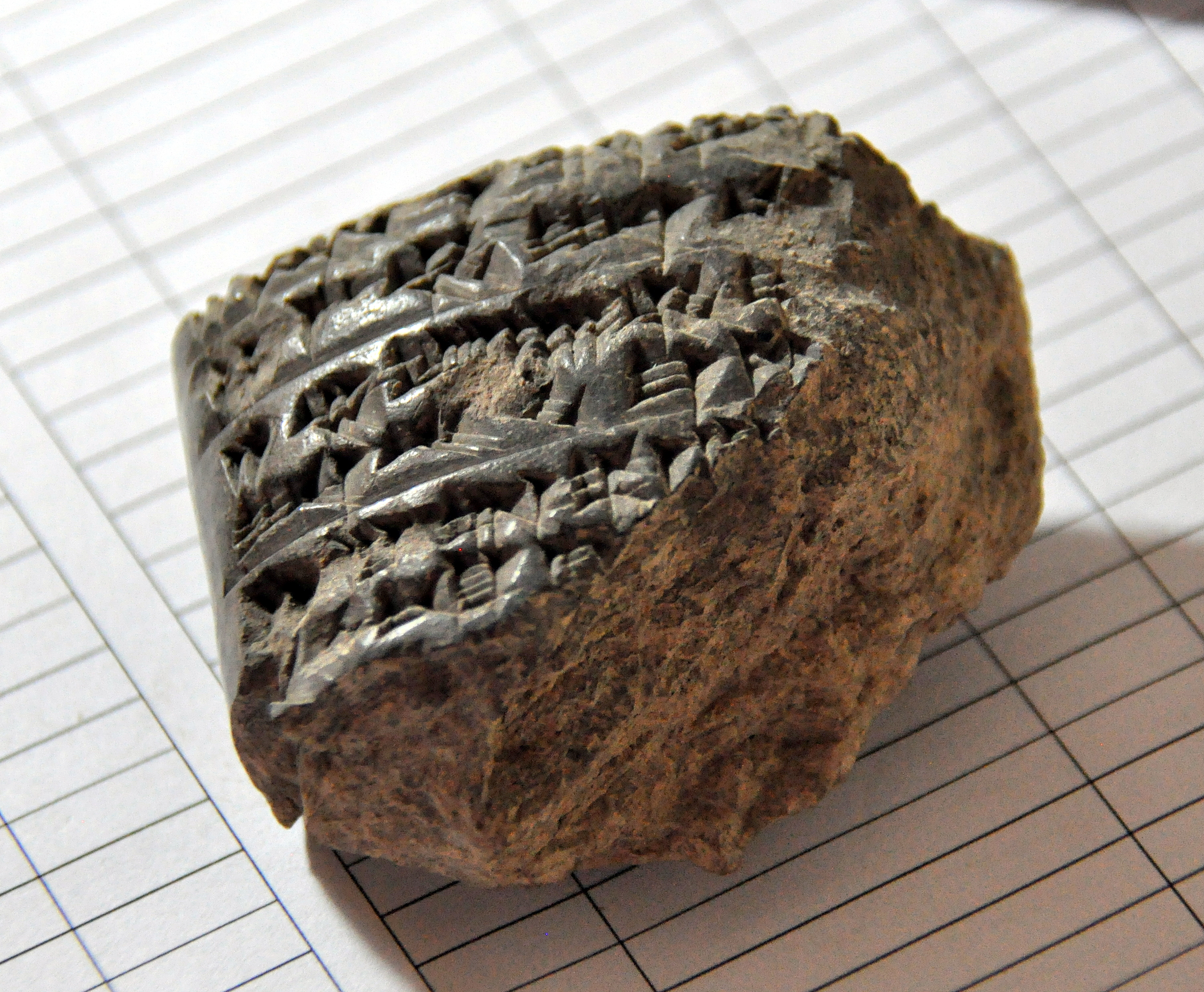
A fragment of a clay tablet with a cuneiform inscription, unearthed September 2014 at Bakr Awa, Sulaymaniyah, Iraq

During the Iraqi excavations 24 cuneiform tablets and tablet fragments were found. In 2013-14 Belgian excavators found 17 more cuneiform tablets. None of the epigraphic finds were in situ, rather being found in the spoil of Islamic period construction. They are possibly all from the same archive and have been tentatively dated by palaeography and C14 dating to the 15th century BC. Texts include "administrative documents, sealed clay bullae, a list of witnesses - probably part of a legal document -, a letter, a hemerology, extispicy omens and prayers, as well as a fragment of the so-called Weidner God-list". A few of the tablet fragments contain text written in the Hurrian language. With one exception it appears that none of the tablets have yet been published.

Graves from the Islamic period, the Iron Age, the Middle/Late Bronze Age, and Akkadian Period have been found at the site. DNA analysis has been done on 18 Bronze and Iron Age samples. In 2026, ancient DNA was sequenced from 17 individuals in the region spanning a period from 2112 BCE to 331 BCE.

== History ==
Though no settlement remains were excavated, late 4th millennium BC Uruk period pottery shards were found.

Excavators defined seventeen citadel occupation levels:

- Levels I-VII - Islamic (modern)
- Levels VIII-X - Hurrian (middle to late 2nd millennium BC)
- Levels XI-XV - Old Babylonian and Isin-Larsa (1st half 2nd millennium BC)
- Levels XVI-XVIII - Ur III and Akkadian (late 3rd millennium BC)

For the Lower Town the stratigraphy was different:

- Level I-II - Islamic
- Level III - circa 800 BC
- Levels IV-VIII - 2nd millennium BC

On the eastern area of the tell a large 30 meter by 22 meter mudbrick building with a 11 meter by 10.5 meter pebbled courtyard dating to the c. 2000 BC (Middle Bronze Age) was initially uncovered by Iraqi excavators and termed a temple. Excavation to lower levels during the Belgian excavations led to the building being reclassified to a residential structure. In particular a feature original thought to be an altar was recognized as a domestic shrine, typical for the period.

=== Iron Age ===
Iron Age occupation at Bakr Awa dates to the Neo-Assyrian period, from the 9th to 7th century BC when it was part of the Assyrian province Zamua, Achaemenid Empire and the Sassanian Empire. Islamic period occupation ranges from the Abbasid period into the Ottoman period. The site continues to be occupied today.

== Economy ==
In the Early Dynastic period, the economy was nomadic and based on sheep and goat (74.1%), mainly killed for meat. There were also remains of cattle and more rarely equids.

In the Akkadian period, the economy shifted from nomadic to more sedentary and pastoral, introducing new elements as pig and poultry breeding as well as wild animal hunting.

== Recent changes ==
The mound and its surrounding areas were lastly excavated in 2017. A recent visit to the site revealed innumerable pits; the telltale "pockmarks" at a looted site which algorithms can recognize and flag as suspicious.

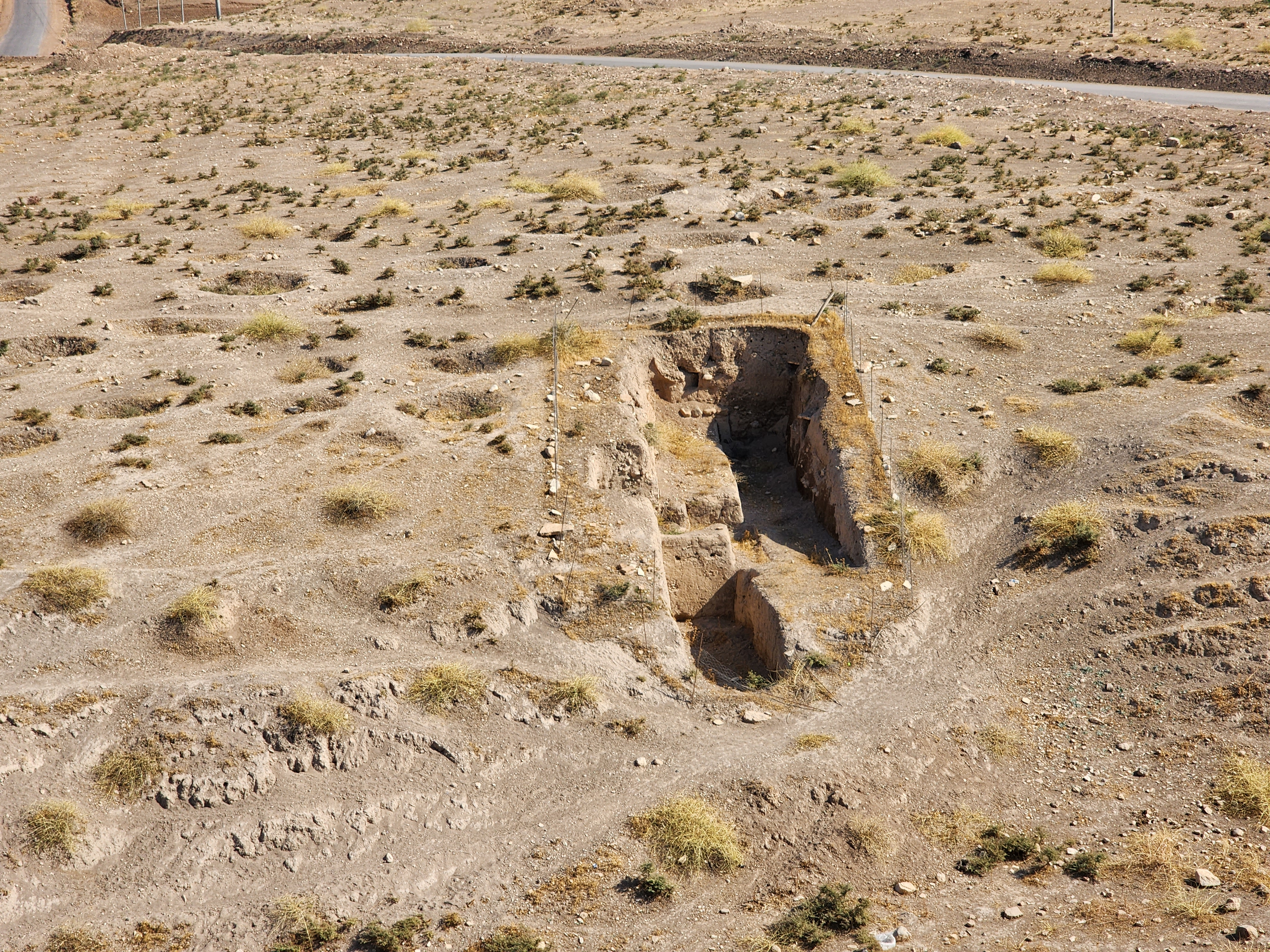
November 4, 2022. A trench from past excavations. The trench is surrounded by numerous looters' pits

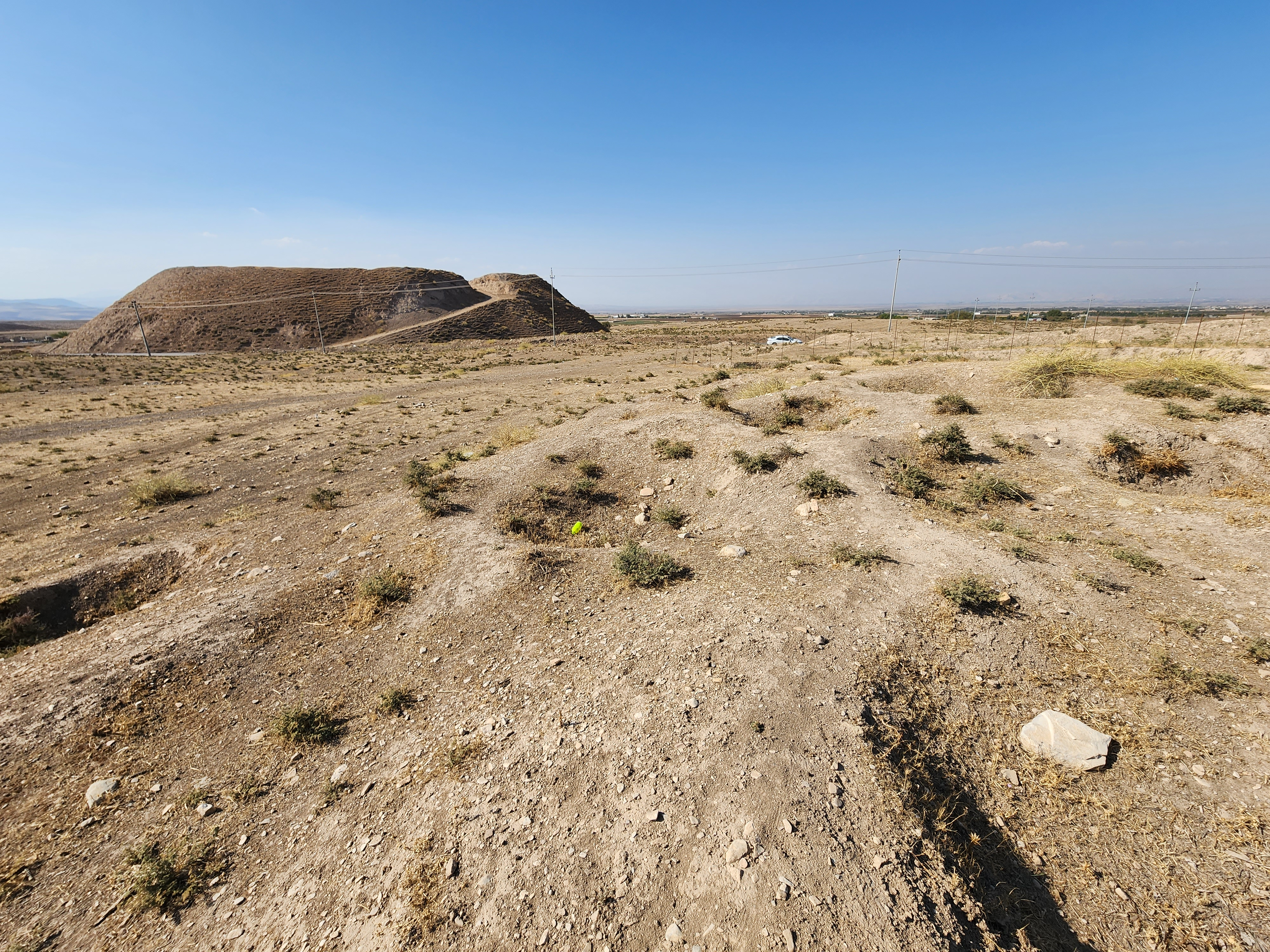
November 4, 2022, Bakr Awa mound. An area before the tell pockmarked with looters' pits

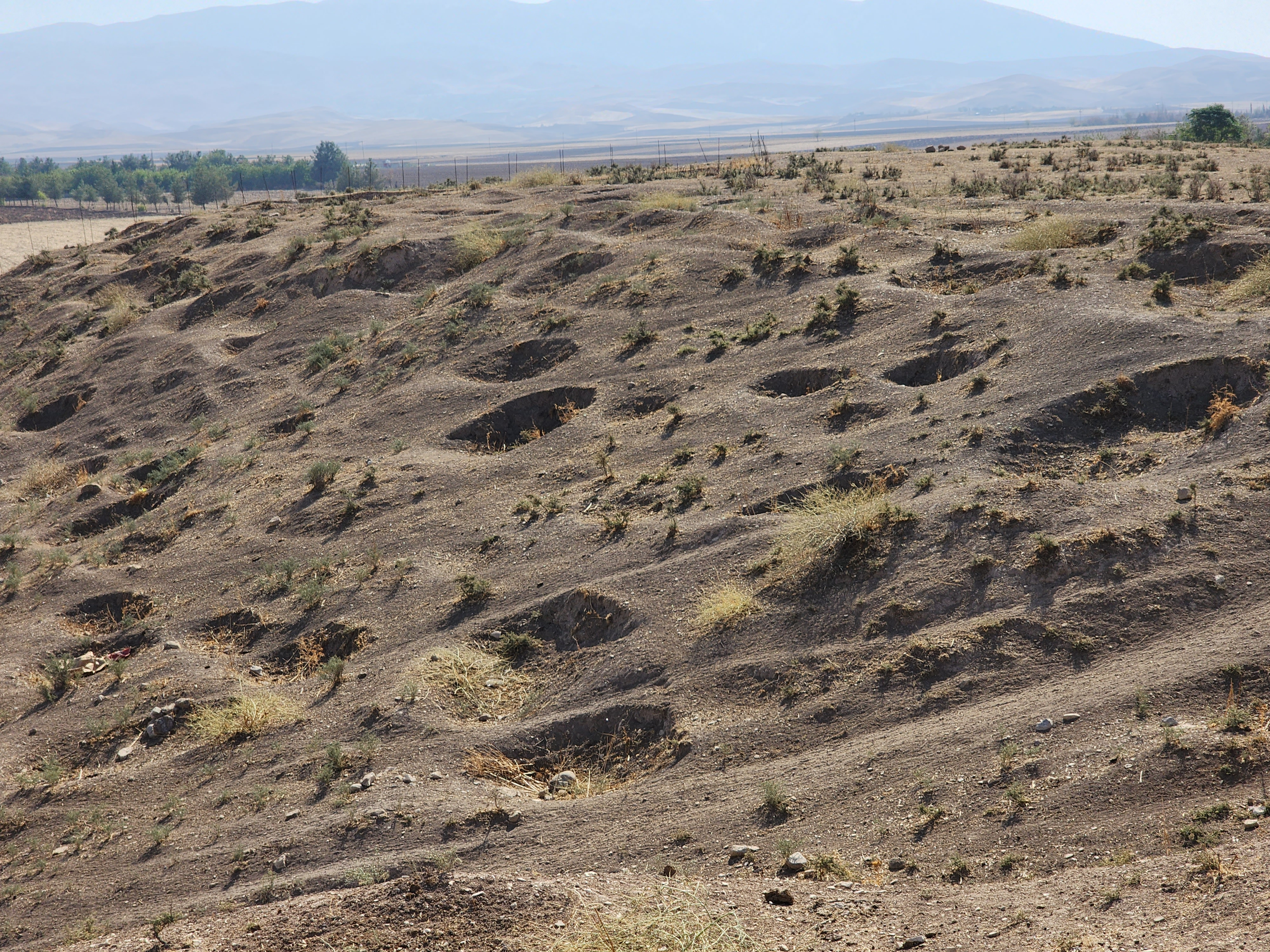
November 4, 2022. An area before the tell shows numerous pits.

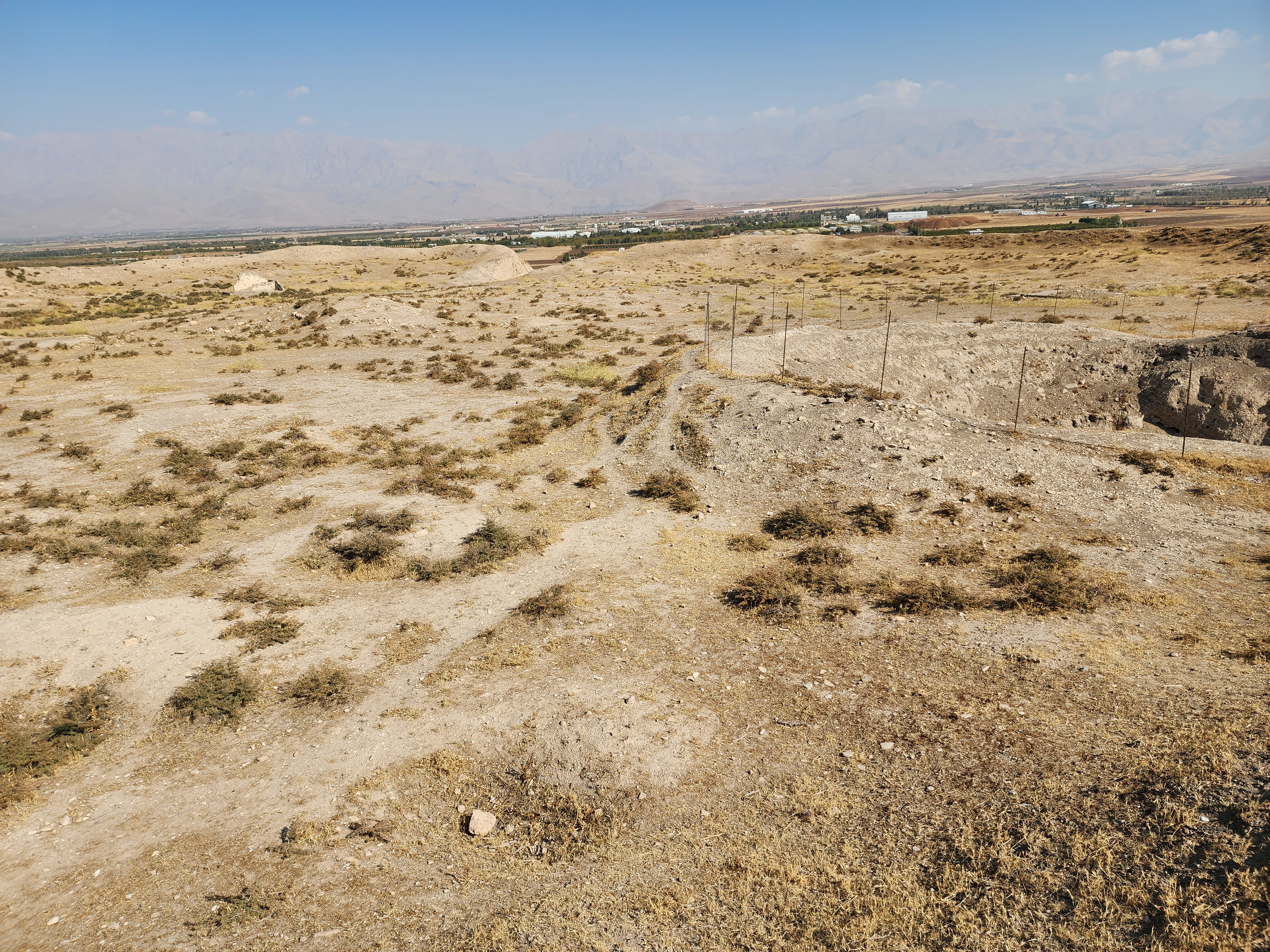
November 4, 2022. The top surface of the tell

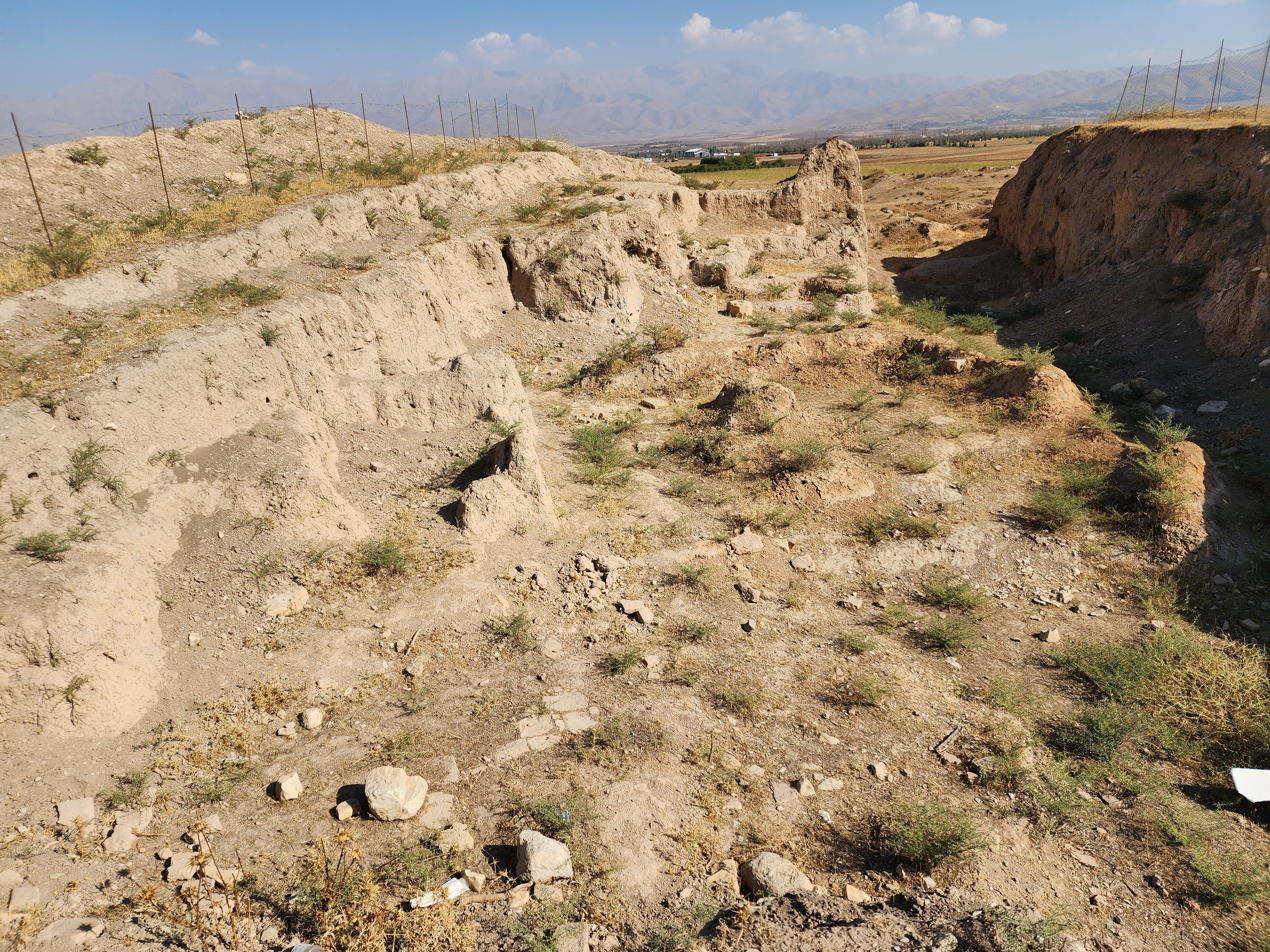
November 4, 2022. An area before the tell

== Gallery ==
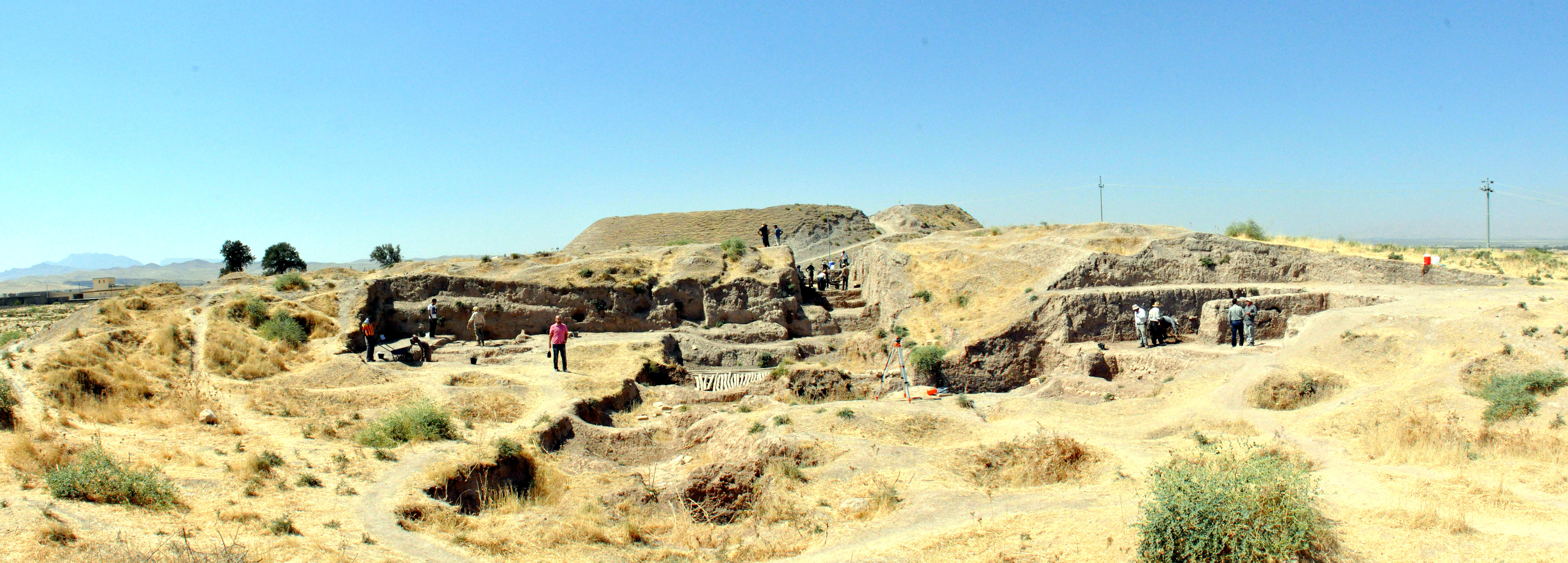
September 18, 2014. Excavations at Bakr Awa

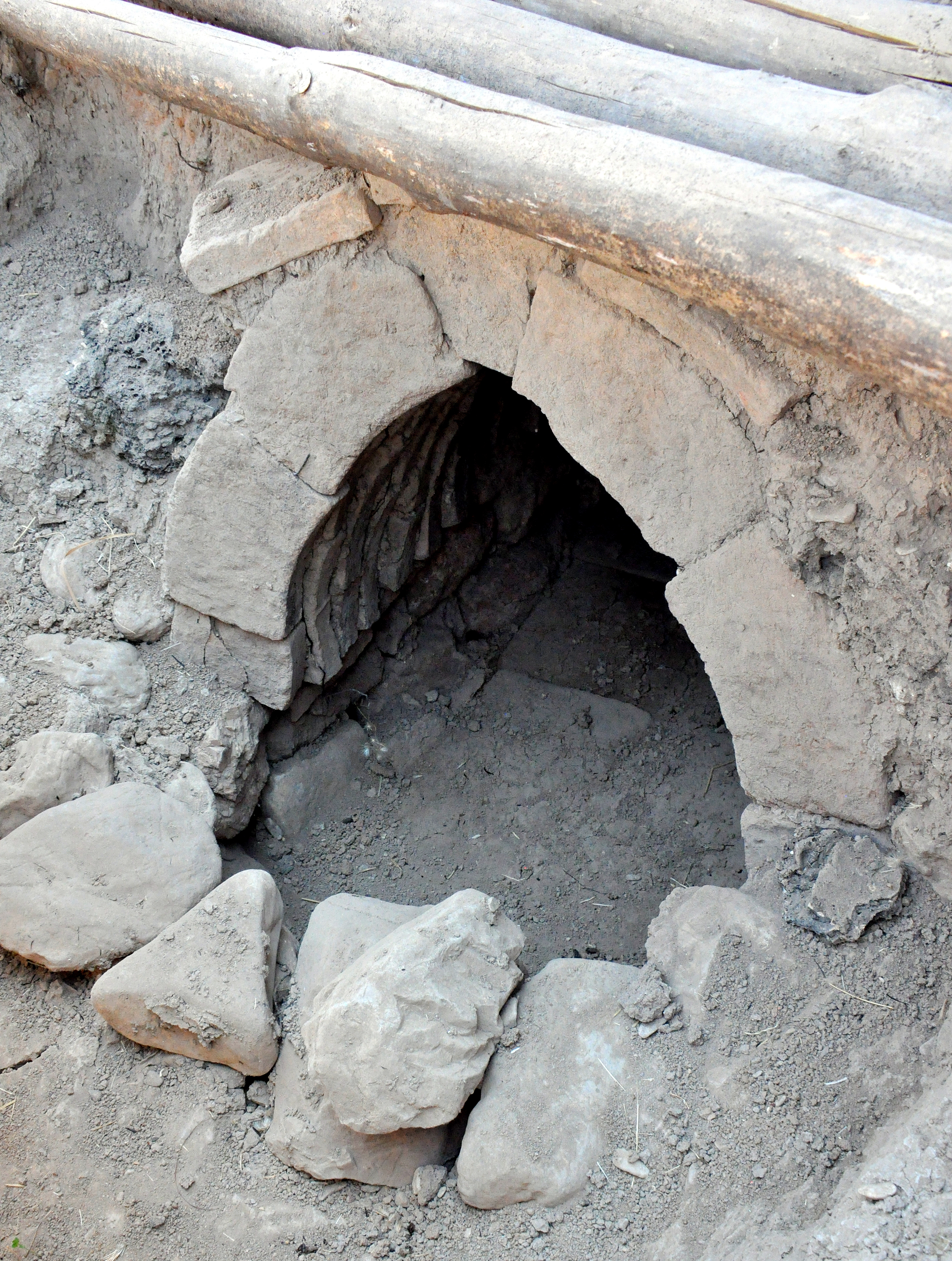
A 1st-millennium BCE, probably Neo-Assyrian, grave at Bakr Awa

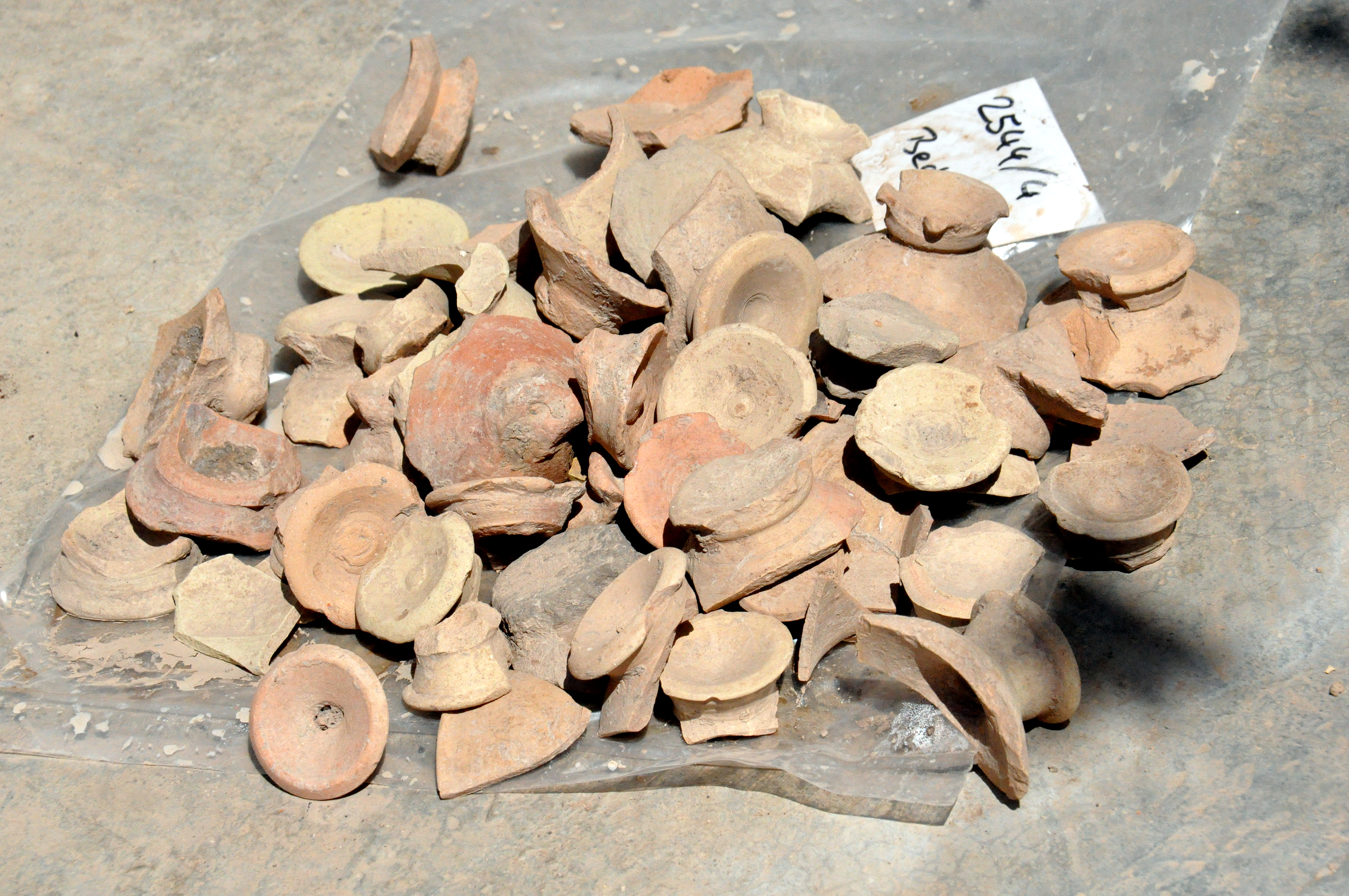
Fragments of pottery unearthed at Bakr Awa

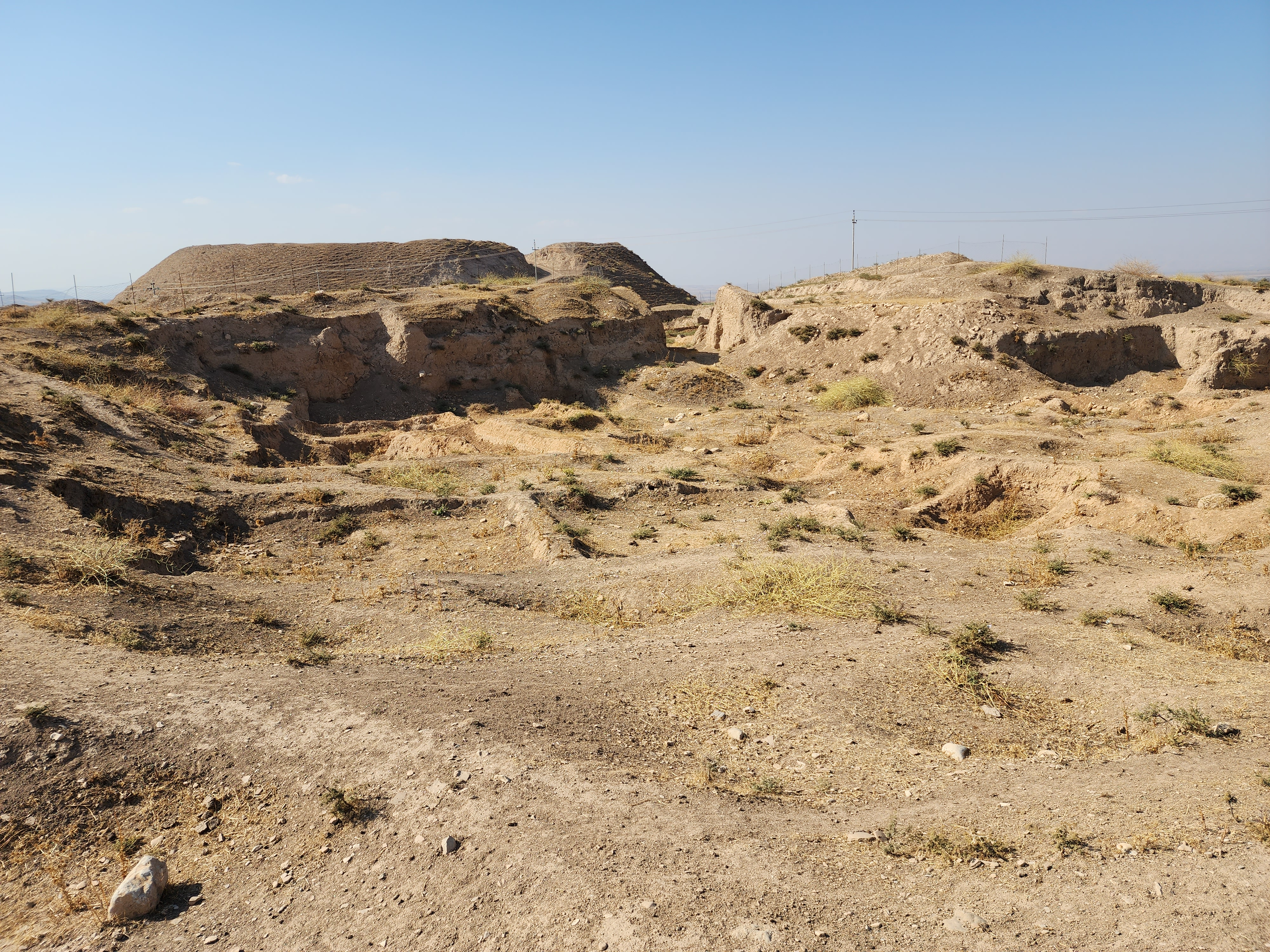
November 4, 2022. An area before the tell shows the remains of the 2010-2014 excavations

== See also ==
- Cities of the ancient Near East
