= Neolithic in the Near East =

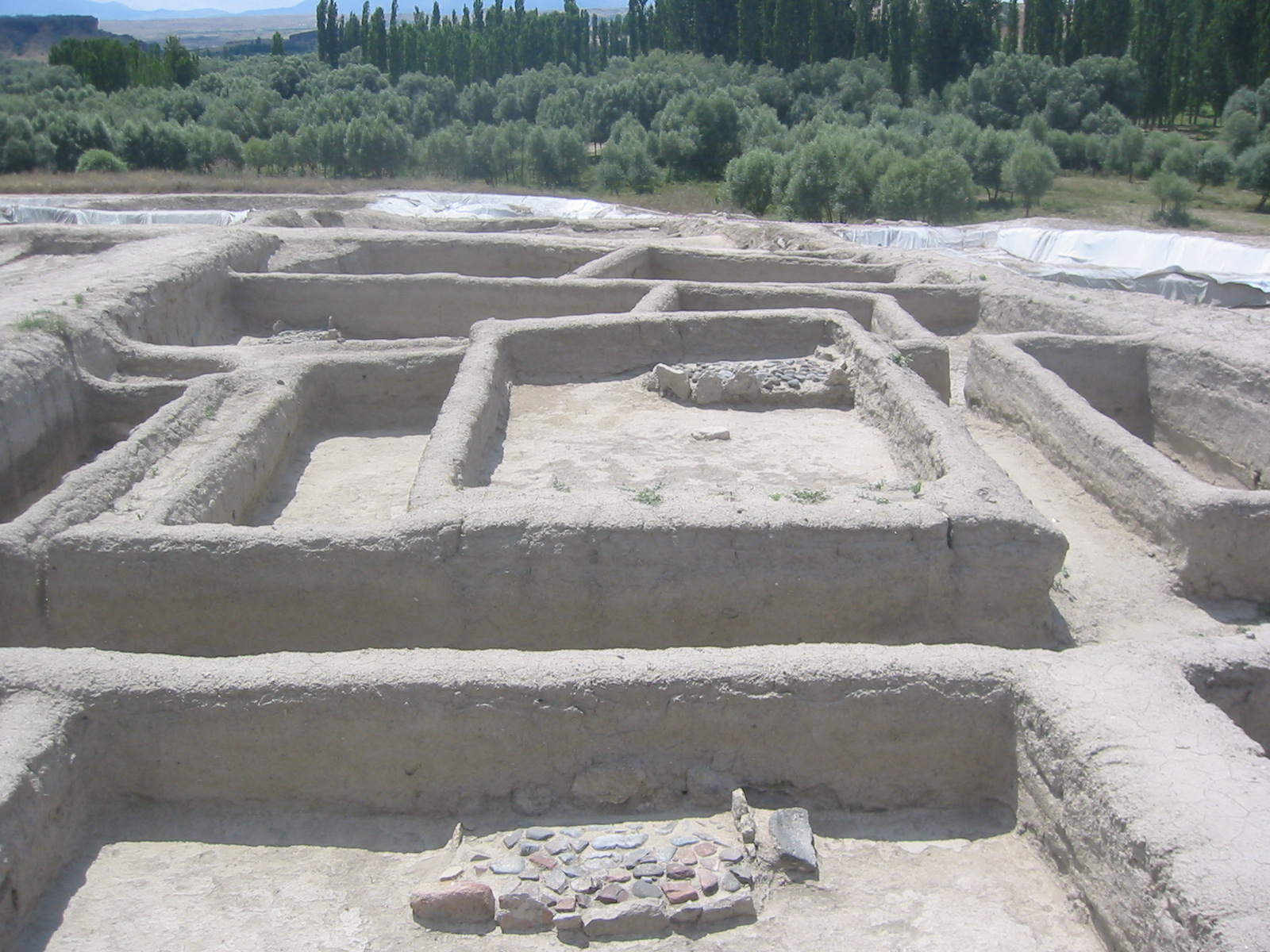
Residential excavation areas at Aşıklı Höyük (Turkey), 8th millennium BC.

Prehistoric Southwest Asia
Axis scale is years Before Present

The Neolithic in the Near East is a period in the prehistory of Western Asia that began with the transition from a Paleolithic to a Neolithic way of life and continued with its consolidation and expansion. It took place between the Levant and the western Zagros, including part of Anatolia, at the beginning of the Holocene, between around 10000 and 5500 BCE (Before the Common Era), or 12000–7500 BP (Before Present).

This period was marked primarily by the adoption of agriculture, particularly cereal cultivation, and the domestication of animals, gradually replacing hunting and gathering. The first elements of the Neolithic way of life emerged during the final phase of the Paleolithic, known in the Near Eastern context as the Epipaleolithic, notably during the Natufian period in the Levant (c. 14,500–10,000 BCE), which saw the development of a sedentary lifestyle. The Neolithic process in the Near East began in the 10th millennium BCE and ended around 7500/7000 BCE. This initial stage is referred to as the "pre-ceramic" Neolithic, characterized by the absence of pottery but the presence of agriculture, animal husbandry, and widespread sedentism. The subsequent phases, known as the Ceramic or Late Neolithic, lasted until around the middle of the 6th millennium BCE. These phases saw the emergence of regional cultures and the spread of the Neolithic way of life to new areas. The period concludes with the development of metallurgy, which marks the beginning of the Metal Ages.

== Background ==
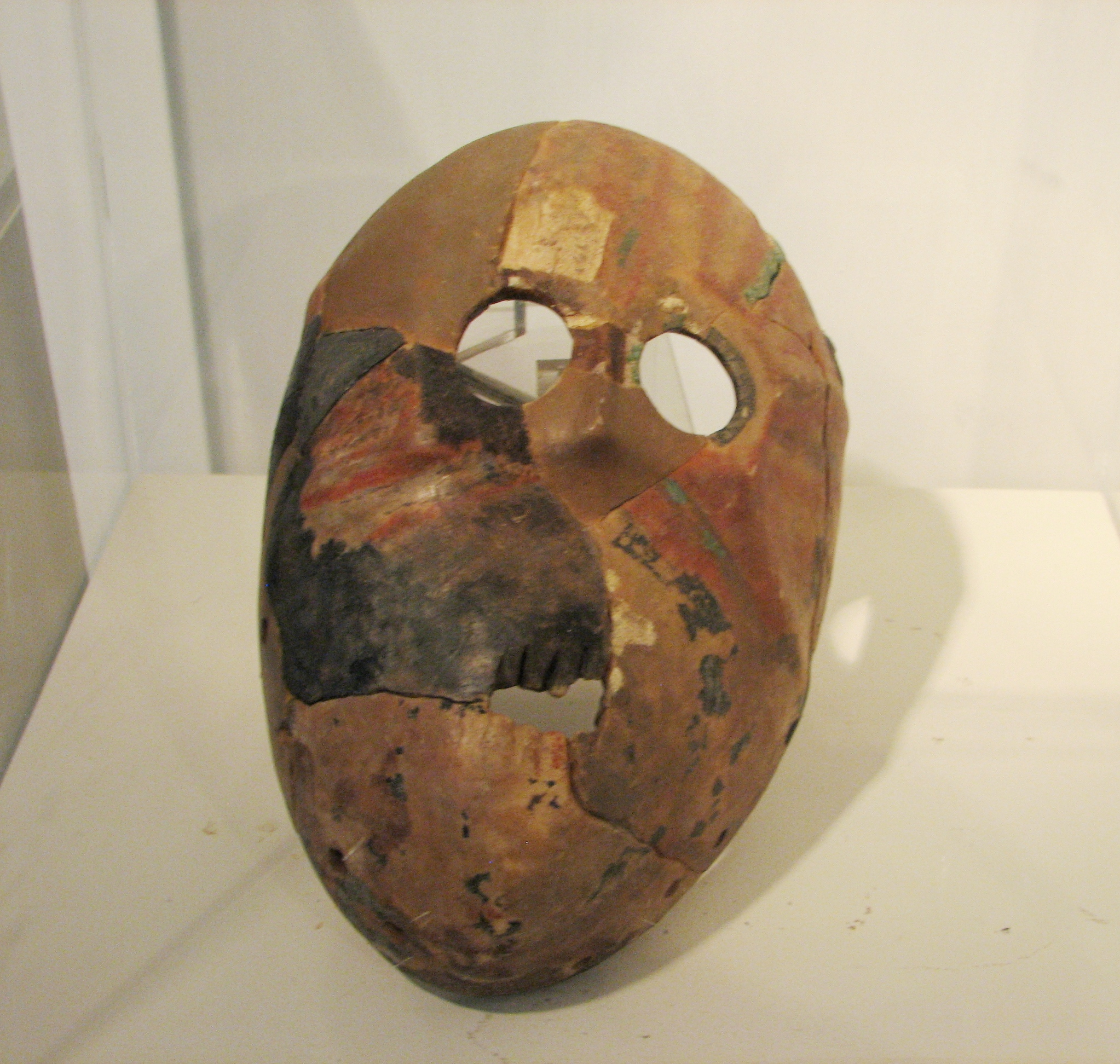
Replica of the stone mask from the Nahal Hemar cave, late 9th millennium BC, Moshe Stekelis Museum of Prehistory, Haifa.

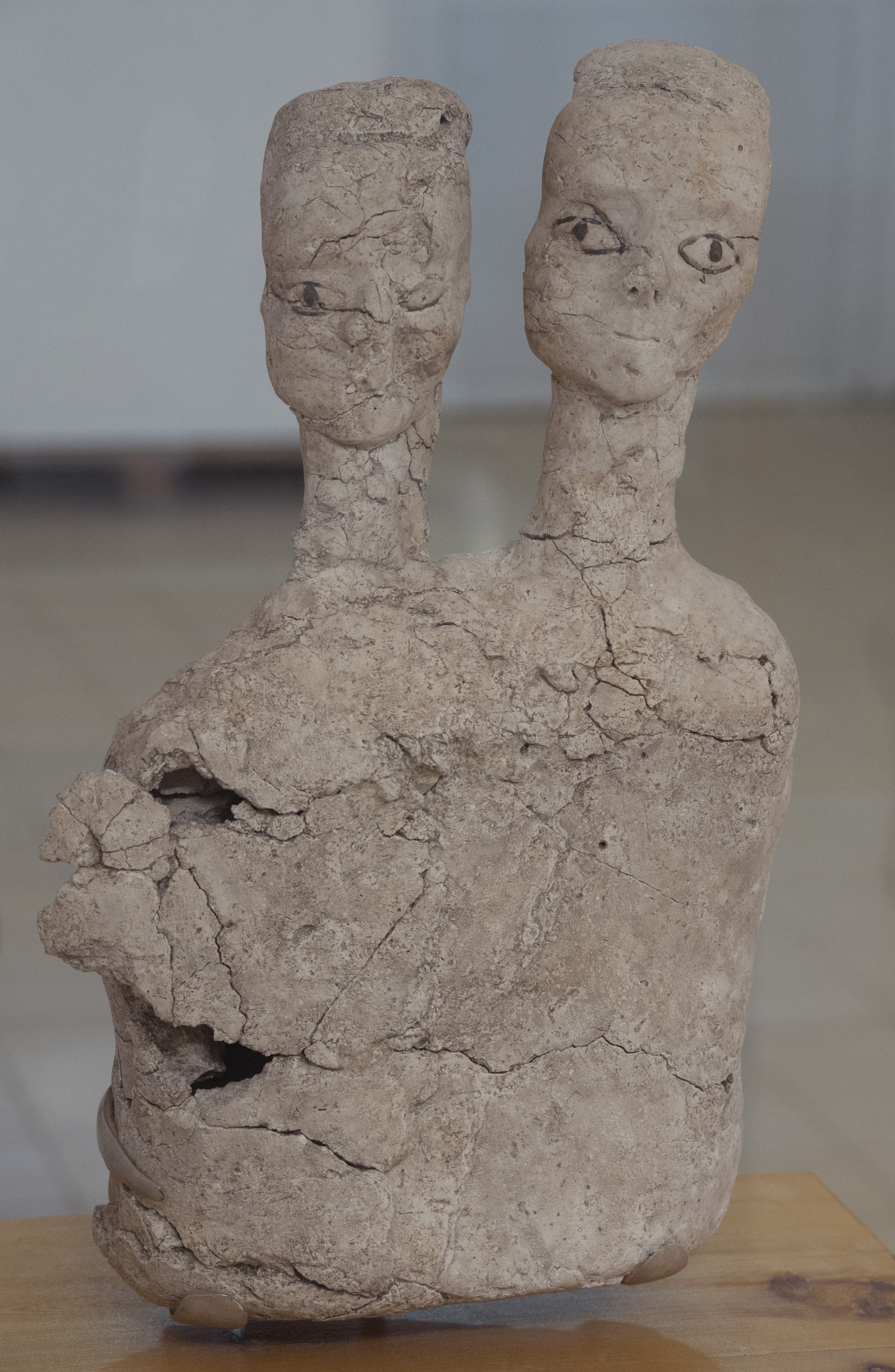
Plaster statuettes from Ayn Ghazal (Jordan), c. 7200–6500 BC.

=== Neolithic Revolution and its causes ===
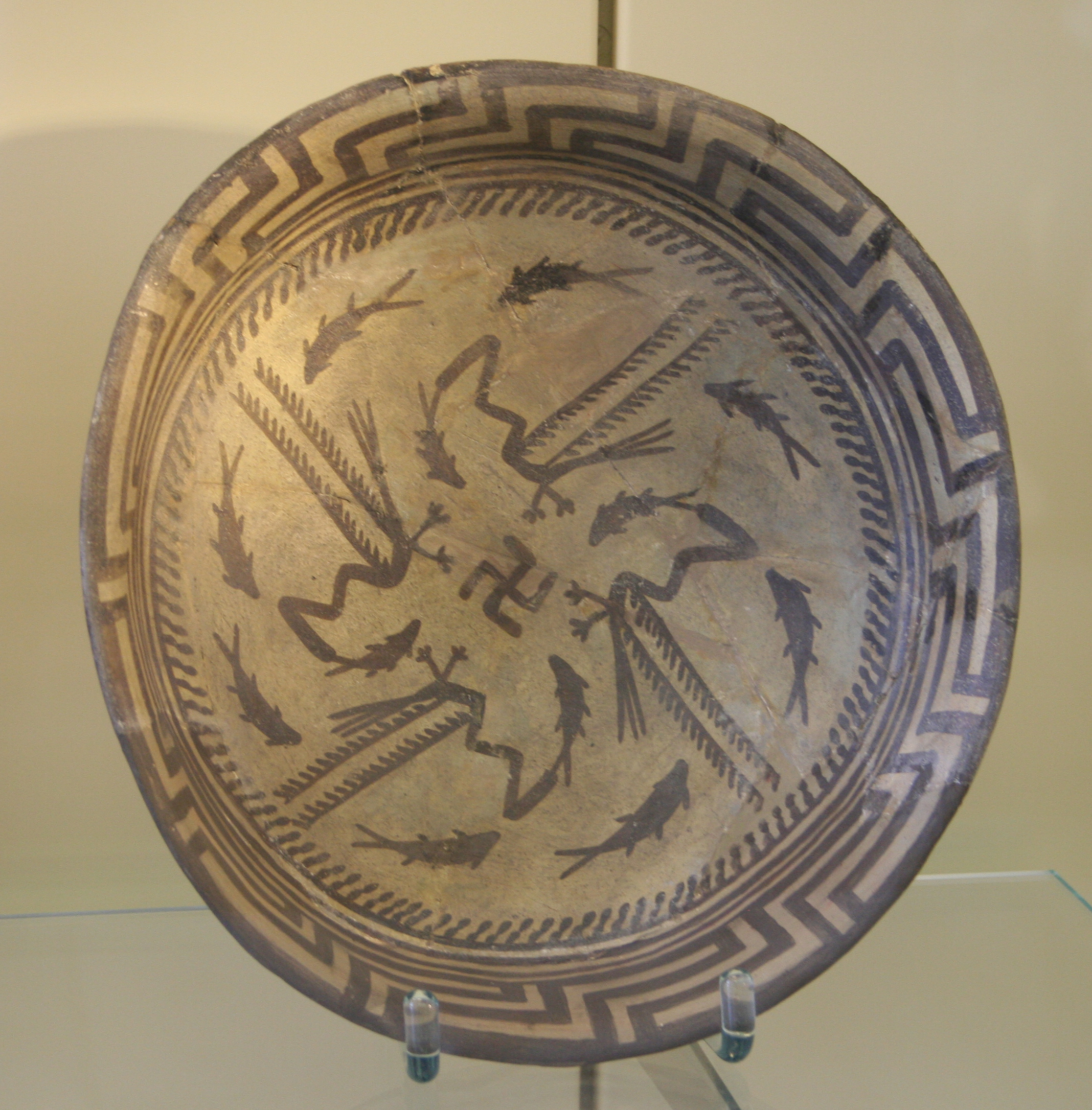
Painted bowl from the Samarra period (central Iraq): waders catching fish, around a swastika, c. 6200–5800 BC. Pergamon Museum.

The concept of the Neolithic was introduced in 1865 by John Lubbock, alongside the Paleolithic, as an extension of Christian Jürgensen Thomsen's "three-age" system (Stone, Bronze, and Iron Ages). It was originally based on technological criteria, primarily the transition from chipped to polished stone tools. The Neolithic concept gained further definition in the 1920s and 1930s through the work of Australian prehistorian Vere Gordon Childe. In his influential book Man Makes Himself (1936), Childe redefined the Neolithic in economic and social terms, coining the term "Neolithic Revolution." Drawing an analogy with the Industrial Revolution, he framed it as a transformative stage in human history, situated between the control of fire and the emergence of "urban revolution".

According to Childe, this period was marked by the development of food-producing village societies. Key features included the cultivation of plants and the domestication of animals, which contributed to population growth, agricultural surpluses, and the establishment of sedentary communities. While Childe viewed these societies as largely self-sufficient, he acknowledged the existence of trade in luxury items. He also emphasized their capacity for collective organization, particularly in agriculture and resource management, and their formation of clan-based political structures reinforced by magical and religious practices. Materially, the Neolithic was characterized by the use of polished stone tools, ceramics, and implements for weaving. Although this model has been revised over time, it remains partially relevant in identifying what is commonly referred to as the "Neolithic package".

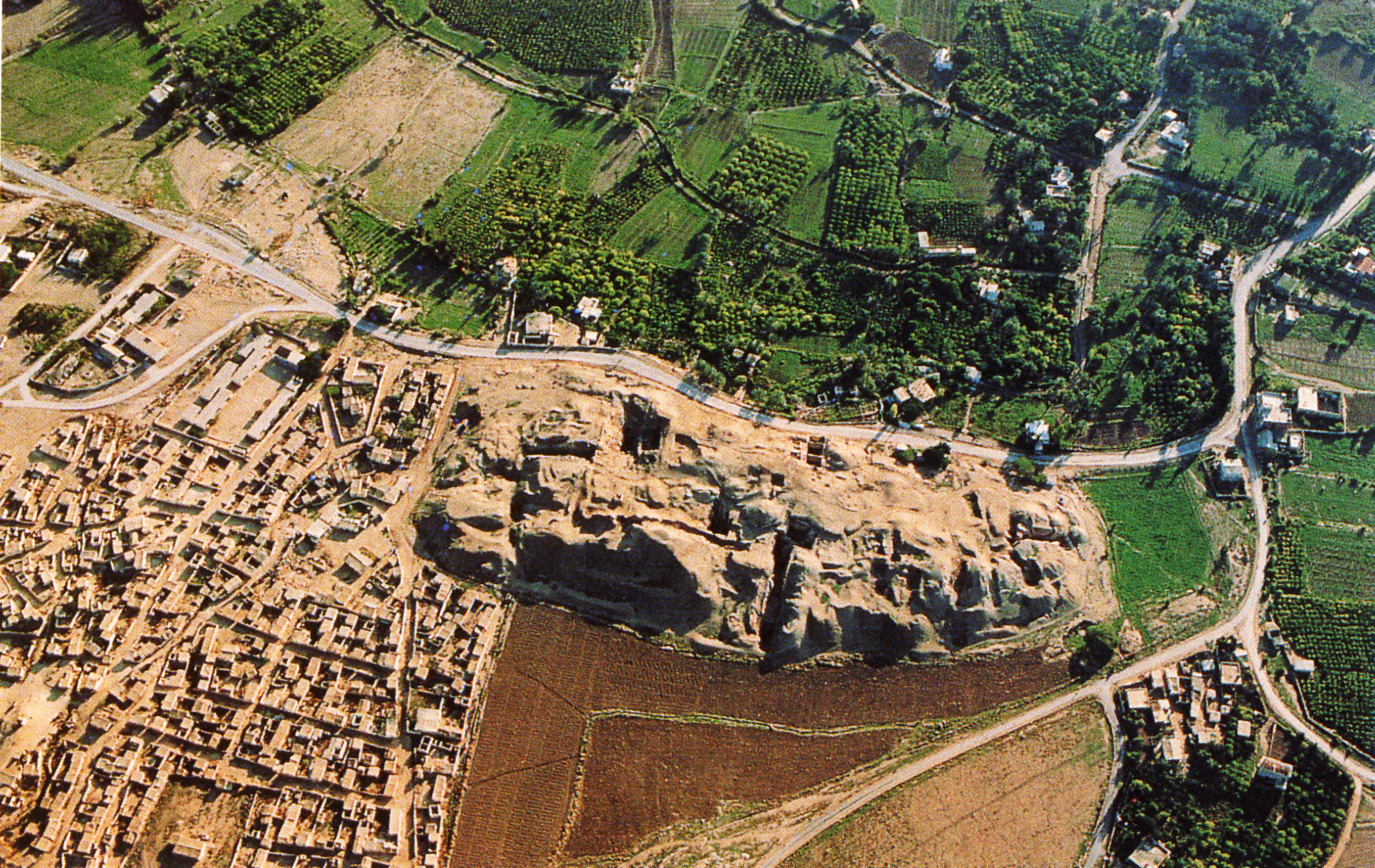
Aerial view of Tell es-Sultan, the archaeological site of Jericho

Research conducted after World War II has contributed to a more nuanced understanding of Neolithic societies, driven by new archaeological discoveries. Excavations of Natufian sites in the 1950s and 1960s demonstrated that sedentism often preceded domestication, challenging earlier assumptions that domestication was a prerequisite for permanent settlement. In the 1950s, Kathleen Kenyon established a chronological framework for the Neolithic in the Levant through her work at Tell es-Sultan in Jericho, identifying distinct phases of a "Pre-Pottery Neolithic." This model remains in use, although it has been critiqued for applying the term "Neolithic" to societies that may not meet all of its defining criteria. Subsequent discoveries have refined the understanding of the Neolithic process. Genetic studies have helped identify multiple centers of domestication, and the excavation of the sanctuary at Göbekli Tepe in southeastern Turkey has illuminated the ritual and symbolic dimensions of early Neolithic societies. Comparative studies with other regions that underwent similar transitions—whether independently or through diffusion—have further informed interpretations of the Neolithic, revealing both commonalities and regional particularities. Ethnographic research has also supported the development of interpretive models rooted in prehistoric archaeological evidence.

As a result, the search for underlying causes has often dominated research on the Neolithic, giving rise to a wide range of theories. These explanations have focused primarily on the origins of domestication, but also on the broader process of Neolithization and its various components.

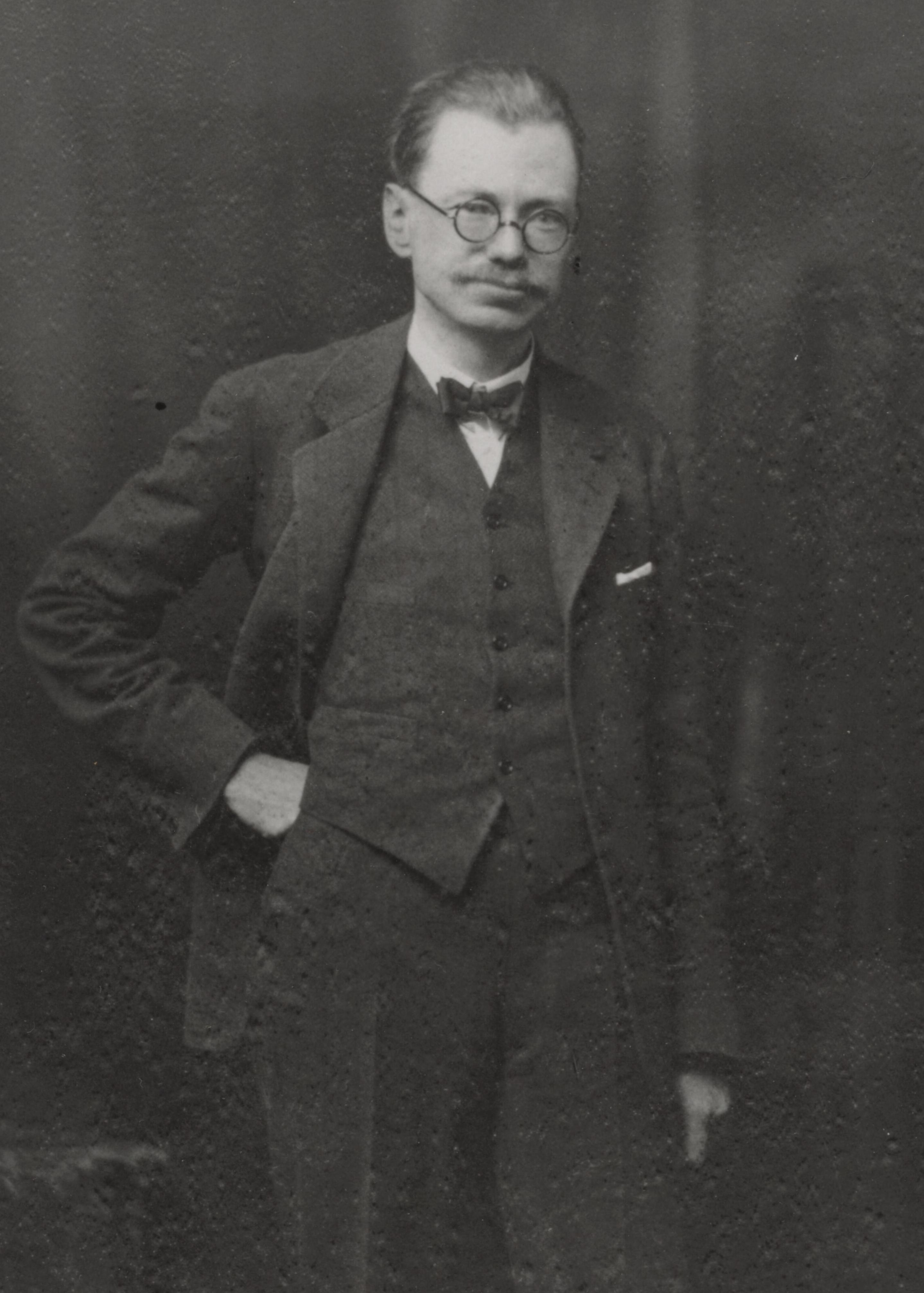
Vere Gordon Childe, who developed the concept of the "Neolithic revolution", photographed in the 1930s.

Vere Gordon Childe, drawing on ideas previously advanced by Raphael Pumpelly, advocated the "oasis theory": the end of the last Ice Age brought about a drier climate, concentrating humans and animals in river valleys and oases in the Middle East, where wild cereals also grew. This close coexistence in restricted areas was thought to have led to the domestication of plants and animals. In contrast, Robert John Braidwood, through his research in the Zagros Mountains during the 1950s, proposed the "hilly flanks theory," which shifted the emphasis toward social and cultural readiness. He argued that Neolithization occurred because societies had developed the necessary tools and knowledge for agriculture and food processing. From the late 1960s, Lewis Roberts Binford introduced a model combining demographic and environmental factors. He suggested that Epipaleolithic communities in the Levant experienced population growth, which, combined with rising sea levels at the end of the Ice Age, created pressure on food resources. This would have led to migration into less populated marginal zones, where communities began domesticating plants and animals. Similar functionalist models emerged, framing Neolithization as an adaptive response to demographic or environmental pressures, and viewing the transition as a necessary stage driven by external constraints. Later theories moved away from strictly materialist explanations. In the 1980s and 1990s, Jacques Cauvin proposed a symbolic and cognitive interpretation, emphasizing a "symbolic revolution"—a transformation in humans' conceptual relationship with their environment—as the primary driver of Neolithic change. Ian Hodder also explored the mental and symbolic dimensions of Neolithic societies, though he viewed them more as developments accompanying other changes rather than as root causes. Since the 2000s, explanatory models have increasingly incorporated multiple factors, recognizing the complex interplay between social, economic, cognitive, and environmental dynamics in the process of Neolithization.

=== Neolithization phenomenon ===
The phenomenon of Neolithization is now understood as a long, complex, and non-linear process. It is characterized by the transition from a hunter-gatherer to a farmer-herder economy, but it also involves a range of technical, social, and cognitive transformations that are interrelated through causal dynamics. Contemporary approaches tend to view the Neolithic not as a singular event, but as a gradual process involving multiple changes over an extended period. According to Ç. Çilingiroğlu:

The 'Neolithic' implies more than technological developments, the appearance of domesticated plants and animals or sedentariness. Henceforth, the term is generally accepted to encompass technological, economic, social and ideological aspects as a whole, thus "the Neolithic way of life".

A. Goring-Morris and A. Belfer-Cohen further elaborate:

The concept of neolithization involved much more than the domestication of plants and animals, for the processes of neolithization also involved the 'domestication' of fire (pyrotechnological developments ultimately leading to the production of pottery) and water (management in the form of wells and irrigation). In addition, and of paramount importance, social 'domestication' with new ways of shaping community identity and interaction, whose very essence changed; these ranged from bonding through kinship, exchange networks, craft specialization, feasting, etc., to rivalry, political boundaries and intra- and inter-community conflictual violence. Ultimately, the 'Neolithic revolution', in the Near East at least, was a long-term, gradual and undirected process, marked by threshold events, the outcome of which was by no means certain.

To define what constitutes a Neolithic society, researchers often refer to the concept of the "Neolithic package," based on the criteria originally outlined by Childe. These characteristics, while somewhat imprecise, typically include indicators such as permanent built structures, domesticated animals, cultivated cereals and legumes, pottery for storage and cooking, polished stone tools for food processing, and axes representing the refinement of lithic technology. As M. Özdoğan and others note, these features collectively represent what is often referred to as the "Neolithic way of life"). However, the specific composition of this material culture varies across regions and periods. Another way to group early Neolithic societies despite regional diversity is through the use of the term koinè, referring to a shared set of traits common to several human groups.

These evolving perspectives have led to the development of more nuanced models, which account for the diversity of phenomena over a long chronological span. Increasingly, scholars trace the origins of Neolithization back to the Epipaleolithic, around 20,000 BCE—ten millennia before the conventional beginning of the Neolithic. This has resulted in a partial deconstruction of the concept of a singular "Neolithic revolution," as many of the traits associated with the Neolithic package have been identified in earlier societies, particularly those of the Final Epipaleolithic. The Neolithic is thus viewed less as a revolutionary rupture and more as the period during which pre-existing elements were fully integrated into a coherent system of social, economic, and cognitive transformation. This approach also acknowledges periods of regression and renewal within the Neolithization process, including phases of experimentation that did not culminate in fully Neolithic societies.

== Geography, landscapes and environment ==
=== Main geographical areas ===
Location of the main Neolithic geographical areas in the Near East.

In Neolithic studies, the Near East is understood as a region extending from the Mediterranean Sea to the Zagros Mountains, and from the Red Sea and the Persian Gulf to the Taurus Mountains. Cyprus and Central Anatolia are often included, as they were quickly integrated into the Neolithization process. This vast area encompasses diverse natural environments and landscapes, which are commonly grouped into several major zones based on geographical and cultural criteria. Among these is the concept of the "Fertile Crescent", first introduced by James Henry Breasted. In its current usage, it refers to a biogeographical area covering the Levant and the slopes and foothills of the Taurus and Zagros ranges, where many of the wild progenitors of domesticated plants and animals were found.

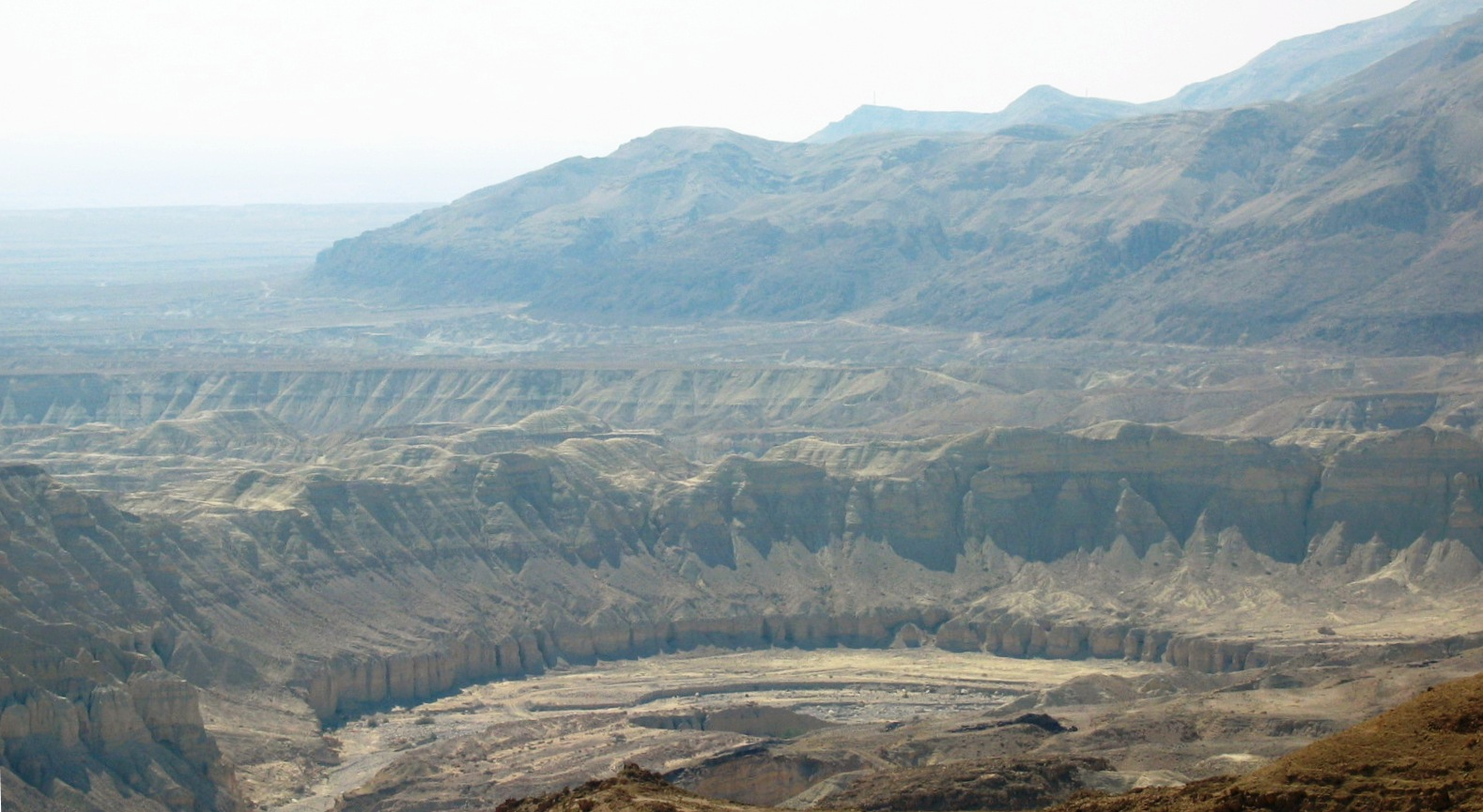
Judean Desert, Nahal Hemar Canyon.

The Levant, situated east of the eastern Mediterranean, is marked by a succession of environments oriented north–south. These include the coastal plain, which was broader during the Epipaleolithic and Neolithic due to lower sea levels; the forested foothills and mountain ranges reaching elevations of up to 2,000 meters; the Rift Valley or "Levantine corridor", which runs below sea level; and the higher plateaus that eventually transition into the Arabian Desert. The Levant is generally divided into three geographical zones, though sometimes only two are distinguished, following a west–east orientation.

- Southern Levant: North of the Sinai and the Negev deserts, this area includes the coastal plain, the Upper Galilee and Judaean mountains, the Jordan Valley (with the Dead Sea and Lake Tiberias), the Arabah plain, and the Transjordanian plateaus to the east.
- Central Levant: Sometimes grouped with either the northern or southern Levant, this zone spans from the Damascus oasis in the south to the Homs Gap in the north. It includes the Lebanese coastal plain, Mount Lebanon, the Litani valley and the Bekaa plain, the Anti-Lebanon Mountains, and the Ghuta oasis near Damascus.
- Northern Levant: Corresponding roughly to western Syria, this region includes the Syrian coastal plain (broadest in the Levant), the Alawite and Amanus mountains, the Orontes Valley, the Amuq Plain, the plateaus of central Syria, and is bounded to the east by the Middle Euphrates, which forms another corridor.

Mesopotamia, in its broadest sense, includes the lands shaped by the Tigris and Euphrates rivers.

- Southeastern Anatolia: The northernmost part of Upper Mesopotamia, structured by the upper valleys of the Tigris and Euphrates, with elevations declining from 800 to 300 meters north to south. Bounded by the Eastern Taurus Mountains in the north and the Jezirah plateaus to the south, the region contains narrow valleys that widen in places to form suitable areas for settlement.
- Jezirah: Known as the "island," this plateau region of Upper Mesopotamia, averaging 250–300 meters in elevation, is dissected by the Tigris, the Euphrates, and their tributaries (the Balikh and Khabur). It is generally divided into a wetter Upper Jezirah to the north-northeast and a drier Lower Jezirah to the south-southwest.
- Mesopotamian alluvial and deltaic plain: A low-lying, flat region with an arid climate today, where the Tigris and Euphrates merge and form a marshy delta before emptying into the Persian Gulf. During the early Neolithic, sea levels were lower, and the gulf extended much farther southeast, possibly as far as the Gulf of Oman.

To the north and east lie mountainous regions, often considered central to the development or spread of the Neolithic way of life.

- Zagros Mountains: Particularly the western and central sections, composed of parallel folds running northwest–southeast. These mountains are deeply incised by rivers flowing toward Mesopotamia (including the Great Zab, Little Zab, Diyala, Karkheh, and Karun), creating isolated valleys. The more humid southwestern slopes transition into foothill zones leading into Mesopotamia.
- Central Anatolia: Separated from the northern Levant by the Taurus Mountains, this high plateau region exceeds 1,000 meters in elevation. It includes a more arid eastern zone featuring Lake Tuz and volcanic cones, and a more forested western zone with a cluster of lakes in the southwest.

The northwestern edge of the Arabian Desert is in fact a steppe, its vegetation and habitability fluctuating with climate changes. During wetter periods in the Neolithic, temporary streams, lakes, and artesian springs supported human settlement, particularly at sites such as el Kowm and Azraq.

The island of Cyprus also forms part of the Near Eastern Neolithic context. Located approximately 100 kilometers from the northern Levantine coast, it is the third-largest island in the Mediterranean. Its geography consists of three east–west zones: the Kyrenia mountain range along the northern coast; the Mesaoria plain; and the Troodos massif in the center-west. The southern coast, especially around the Akrotiri peninsula and the Larnaka plain, hosted the main prehistoric settlements.

=== Climate fluctuations and their impact ===
The Near Eastern Neolithic took place during the transition from the last Ice Age to the Holocene. However, this period was not marked by a simple, linear warming trend; instead, it featured several significant climatic fluctuations during the Epipaleolithic and Neolithic phases:

- The Late Glacial Maximum (c. 23,000/22,000 to 17,000 BCE) was the coldest and driest phase of the era. It was followed by a gradual warming and an increase in precipitation, which led to the slow retreat of semi-arid zones.
- The Bölling-Alleröd interstadial, beginning around 12,700–12,500 BCE and lasting perhaps until 11,000/10,800 BCE, was a warmer and wetter phase. It enabled the expansion of wooded areas in the southern Levant and the development of grassy and humid landscapes, including lakes, in Anatolia.
- The Younger Dryas (c. 11,000–9,700 BCE, possibly extending to 9,000 BCE in some estimates) was a cold and dry period. However, a study focused on the southern Levant suggests that, while the period was colder, it was not necessarily drier than the preceding one.
- The Early Holocene brought a general climatic amelioration. Although initially dry, it saw a more rapid shift toward wetter conditions around 8,200–8,000 BCE, with some estimates placing the change around 7,500 BCE. This period marked the wettest climatic phase observed in the Levant and eastern Mediterranean over the last 25,000 years. The Arabian Desert also received more precipitation between 8,000 and 4,000 BCE than it does today, and the southern Mesopotamian region likely featured more extensive marshland.
- This overall trend was interrupted by the 8.2 ka event (c. 6,200 BCE), a cold and arid phase that lasted approximately 160 to 200 years.

These fluctuations in temperature and precipitation significantly impacted the natural environment, though the effects varied across regions. Valleys may have been less affected than steppe zones, where evidence suggests that human occupation fluctuated in response to these environmental changes. In the Levant and Upper Mesopotamia, variations in precipitation—especially during winter—had a greater influence on human societies than temperature shifts. Under current conditions, a minimum of 200 mm of annual precipitation is typically required for "dry" farming without irrigation. In marginal zones, this threshold may be exceeded in one year and not reached in another, contributing to shifting boundaries of agricultural viability within the "Fertile Crescent".

The ways in which human groups adapted to these environmental changes remain a subject of debate. The same climatic phenomenon may have prompted different responses, and the archaeological record does not always provide unambiguous interpretations. For example, the Younger Dryas is often cited as a factor influencing settlement patterns during the Late Natufian period. Some scholars argue that it caused a decline in sedentarism, while others suggest it led to intensified environmental exploitation by certain sedentary groups, ultimately resulting in plant and animal domestication. Although not necessarily the primary cause of Neolithization, climate change is generally regarded as a significant factor that created conditions favorable to its development. The correlation between the onset of the Holocene and the emergence of agriculture—and, more broadly, of the Neolithic—is widely seen as more than coincidental, especially as similar patterns have been observed in other regions of the world.

=== Environmental impact of human activities ===
The introduction of the Neolithic way of life led to a significant intensification in the human modification of the environment, contributing to the shaping of landscapes and accelerating the process of anthropization. While anthropogenic impact on the environment was not new—humans had been altering ecosystems since the domestication of fire—Neolithic societies brought this to a new level. Even earlier, hunter-gatherers had already begun to manage their surroundings by selectively targeting plant species and regulating herds of wild animals through controlled hunting. In the Neolithic, this interaction evolved into a more sustained and large-scale transformation through the adoption of agriculture and animal husbandry. In scientific terms, this is often described using the concepts of "niche construction" and "ecosystem engineering"—borrowed from biology, where they originally referred to the environmental modification behaviors of certain animal species, such as beavers. The establishment of an agro-pastoral economy initiated a continuous process of environmental transformation. This included not only geographic expansion into new areas, but also the domestication and manipulation of plants and animals through artificial selection, which led to genetic changes and the displacement of species beyond their natural habitats. These interventions altered existing ecosystems and, in turn, affected human behavior. Societies had to adapt to the evolving traits of domestic species, modify agricultural techniques, and develop water management strategies, including early forms of irrigation. Population growth, spurred by the greater food security offered by agriculture and livestock breeding, further accelerated this expansion and environmental modification. The process is characterized by feedback loops in which the consequences of human intervention reinforced and intensified the original changes, creating a cycle of increasingly complex human-environment interactions.

== Phases of the Near Eastern Neolithic ==
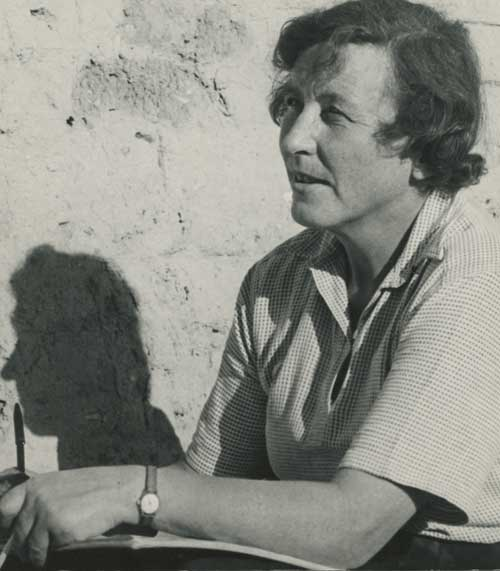
Kathleen Kenyon, director of the excavations at Jericho (Tell es-Sultan) and inventor of the notion of Pre-Ceramic Neolithic.

=== Timeline ===
Neolithic periodization in the Near East comprises several systems. In the Levant, the most widely used terminology is derived from the framework established by Kathleen Kenyon during her excavations at Jericho (Tell es-Sultan), which distinguishes two main phases of the "Pre-Pottery Neolithic" (abbreviated PPN), labeled A and B, followed by phases of the "Pottery Neolithic", now generally referred to as the Late Neolithic. This chronology has since been refined. Pre-Pottery Neolithic A (PPNA) is now subdivided into several cultures based on period and region, including the Khiamian, Mureybetian, and Sultanian. Pre-Pottery Neolithic B (PPNB) is typically divided into Early, Middle, and Late (or Recent) sub-periods. In the Southern Levant, a Pre-Pottery Neolithic C (PPNC) has been proposed, and various regional cultures are associated with the Late Neolithic, including Hassuna and Samarra in Mesopotamia. The pre-pottery chronological system initially defined for the Levant has been extended to southeastern Anatolia and Cyprus, and sometimes to northern Iraq. However, this system is rarely applied to Central Anatolia and the Zagros region, where the distinction between Neolithic phases with and without pottery continues to be used instead.

For the Epipaleolithic phases, the periodization developed by Dorothy Garrod in the 1930s remains in use. This includes the Kebaran and Natufian cultures of the Southern Levant and the Zarzian of the Zagros. The Kebaran has since been subdivided into two or three phases, and is sometimes extended to the Northern Levant.

The dating of these phases varies depending on the region, archaeological site, and even among different researchers. Chronologies may use either calibrated BCE dates or calibrated "Before Present" (BP) dates, with a standard difference of 1,950 years—often rounded to 2,000 years—between the two systems. These differing approaches to dating continue to present challenges for reconciliation across regions and scholarly sources.

Chronology of the Neolithic in the Levant, according to various dates (proposal by K. Wright based on other work).
	BC	Pre-present
Early Natoufian	12780–11180	14730–13130
Late Natoufian	11180–10040	13130–11990
Pre-Ceramic Neolithic A	10040–8940	11990–10890
Early Pre-Ceramic Neolithic B	8940–8460	10890–10410
Middle Pre-Ceramic Neolithic B	8460–7560	10410-9510
Late Pre-Ceramic Neolithic B	7560–6940	9510–8890
Late Pre-Ceramic Neolithic B/C	6940–6400	8890–8350
Late Neolithic	6400–5480	8350–7430

=== Before Neolithization (c. 22000–10000 BC) ===
In Southwest Asia, the final periods of the Paleolithic are referred to as the Epipaleolithic, a term that emphasizes continuity with the Upper Paleolithic. The term Mesolithic is rarely used in the Near Eastern context. In the southern Levant, a succession of cultures is identified: the Kebaran (c. 19,000–16,000 BCE), the Geometric Kebaran (c. 15,500–12,500 BCE), and the Natufian (c. 12,500–10,000 BCE). In the Zagros region, the local culture is known as the Zarzian (c. 18,000–10,000 BCE). In the Caucasus and eastern Anatolia, a contemporaneous culture referred to as Trialeti is sometimes distinguished. However, in most of Anatolia, the Epipaleolithic period does not have a specific local cultural designation.

Human groups during this era were mobile hunter-gatherers who exploited a wide variety of food resources. Over time, these groups began to adopt more territorial and localized settlement patterns. They occupied sites of varying sizes, constructed circular structures, and initially settled on a seasonal basis. In the Levant, particularly during the Natufian period, some groups began to show signs of partial sedentarization. It is possible that these communities experimented with pre-domesticated forms of plant cultivation and animal management. Current scholarship generally considers that Epipaleolithic communities possessed many of the foundational elements of what would later define the Neolithic way of life and that they played a central role in its development. As such, the Neolithic is no longer viewed as the beginning of the transition to agriculture, but rather as a later stage in a longer trajectory of change. According to N. Munro and L. Grosman, it is better understood as "a recent stage or end point within a larger transformation in cultural dynamics that began during the Epipaleolithic".

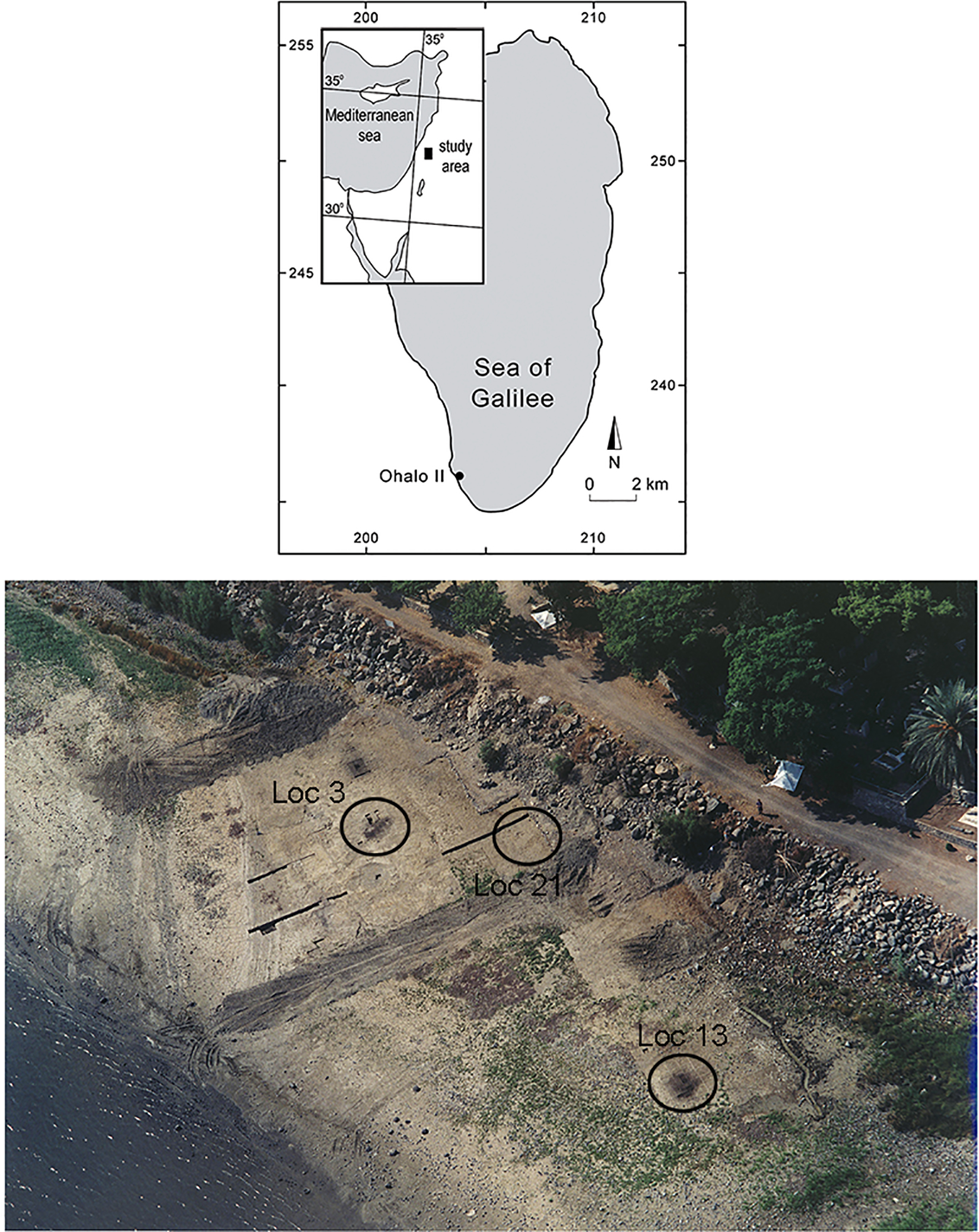
Location and aerial view of the Ohalo II site.

==== Early and Middle Epipaleolithic (c. 22000–12500 BC) ====
The Early Epipaleolithic in the southern Levant is marked by the Masraquian (c. 22,000–19,000 BC), followed by the Kebaran (c. 19,000–16,000 BC) in the west and the Nizzanian (c. 18,000–16,000 BC) in the arid east. These groups are characterized by varied lithic assemblages, reflecting the presence of several mobile bands occupying small territories. Sites are generally small, between 25 and 100 m², although the Nizzanian includes larger sites (up to 20,000 m²). Notable sites from this period include Ohalo II (c. 21,000 BC), located on the shores of Lake Huleh, where evidence of a "broad-spectrum" subsistence strategy was found, including gathering wild plants (herbs, cereals, figs), hunting (gazelle, hares), and fishing.

The Geometric Kebaran (c. 15,500–12,500 BC), a middle phase of the Epipaleolithic, is distinguished by trapezoidal, rectangular, and triangular microliths. Sites from this period are rare and poorly documented, with limited archaeological surveys.

In the Zagros, the transition between the Baradostian (Upper Paleolithic) and Zarzian (Epipaleolithic) is marked by the continuation of hunting, particularly wild goats, sheep, and fallow deer. However, the specifics of this transition and cultural development remain poorly understood due to limited research.

==== Late Epipaleolithic (c. 12500–10000 BC) ====
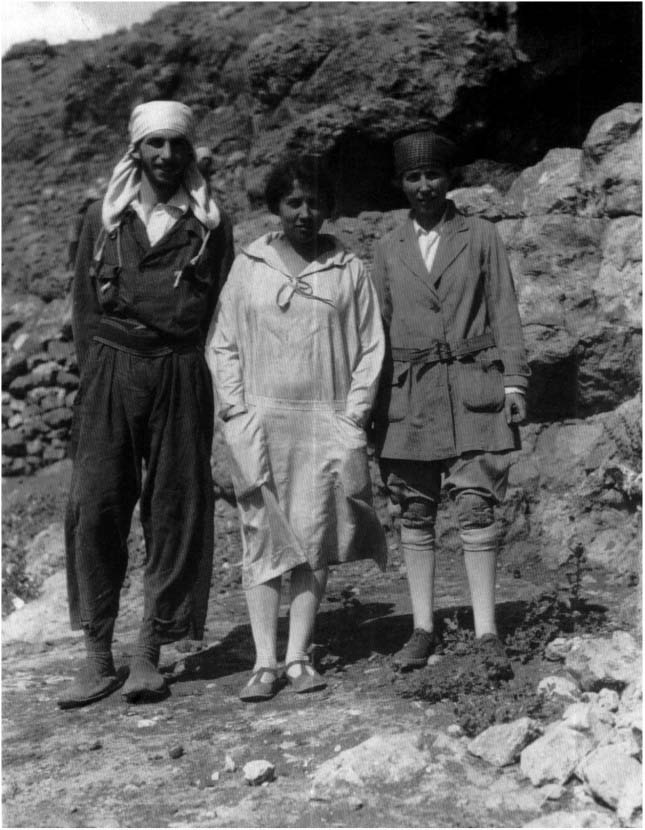
Dorothy Garrod (center) and two collaborators in front of the Shuqba cave in 1928, where her excavations identified the Natoufian culture.

Location of Natoufian and associated sites.

The Natoufian corresponds to the Final Epipaleolithic of the Levant, emerging around c. 12,500–9,600 BC. It likely developed from the Mount Carmel and Galilee areas, with the highest concentration of sites found in the southern Levant, though sites are also attested as far as the Middle Euphrates. Defined by Dorothy Garrod in the 1930s based on its lithic industry (notably microliths), the Natoufian marks the beginning of sedentarization, especially during the Early Natoufian (c. 12,500–11,500 BC). This period benefited from the favorable Bölling-Alleröd climatic phase. Natoufian sites include open-air settlements (e.g. Mallaha and Wadi Hammeh 27), rock shelters (e.g. Hayonim and Nahal Oren), and cave entrances (e.g., El Wad, Shuqba). These sites are typically small, with semi-buried circular structures. Some sites were permanently occupied, while others were temporary, reflecting the semi-sedentary nature of the population. Subsistence strategies were diverse, with a focus on cereal gathering and gazelle hunting, though evidence for pre-domestic agriculture and animal husbandry is inconclusive. Mortars became more developed, indicating food processing. Social structures appear mostly egalitarian, though distinctions in funerary material suggest possible hierarchies. The Late Natoufian (c. 11,500–9,600 BC) coincided with the onset of the Younger Dryas cold, dry period. This led to a decline in sedentary life, particularly in the southern Levant, as groups became more mobile to adapt to the harsher environment. However, some sites in the Middle Euphrates (Mureybet, Abu Hureyra) thrived during this time.

In the rest of the Middle East, the period is less well known, so the definition of cultural areas is less clear-cut.

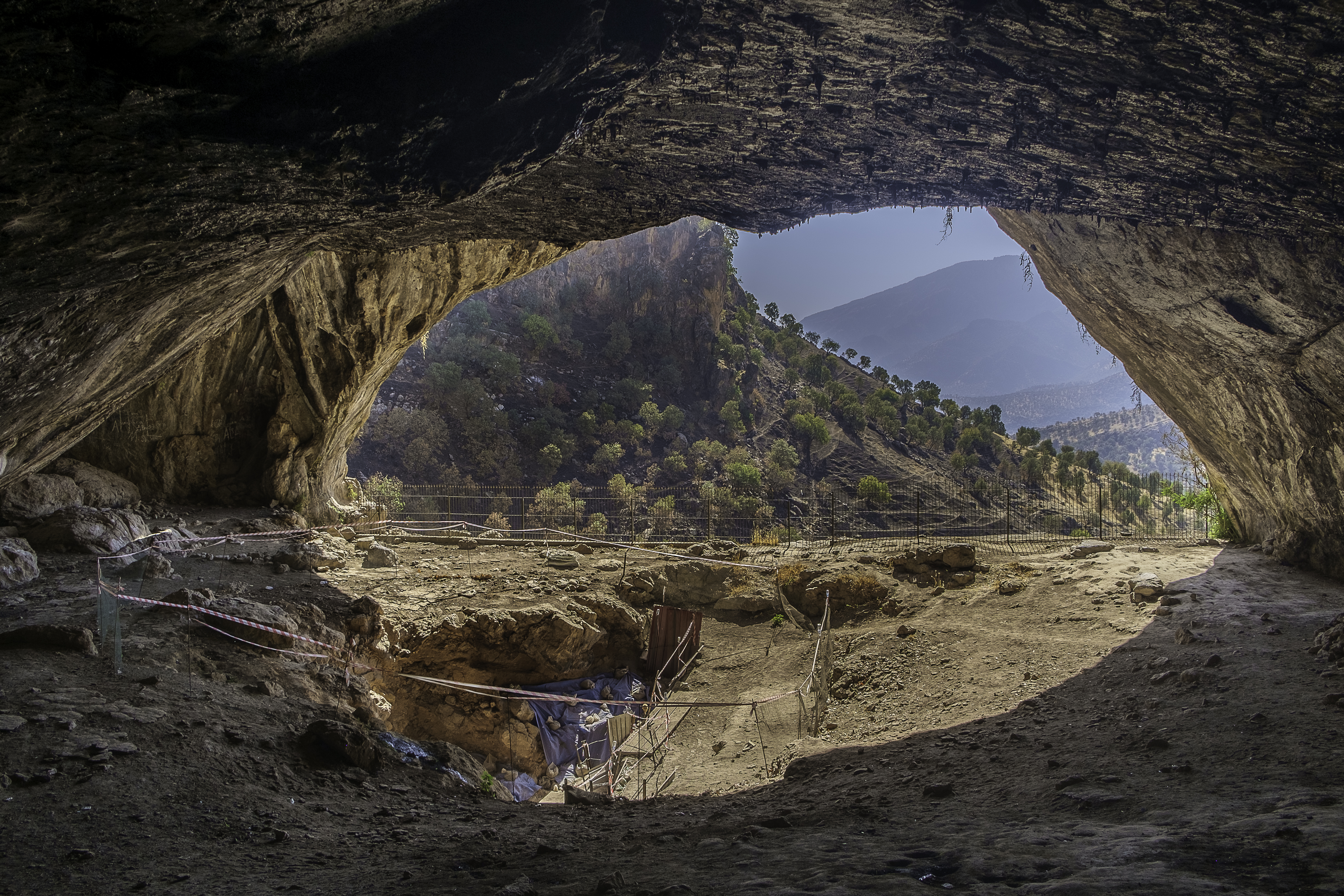
Interior of the Shanidar cave (Iraq), with the archaeological site in the foreground.

The Zarzian culture, defined by Dorothy Garrod based on its lithic tools, is known primarily from the Western Zagros. Sites from this period, such as Warwasi, Zarzi, Shanidar, and Palegawra, are mostly from excavations in the 1950s–60s, and thus the period remains poorly understood. Surveys in the Marv Dasht and Arsanjan plains indicate dense occupation, with base camps surrounded by satellite sites, mainly caves. This phase is characterized by microlithic tools, especially small, geometric blades. Habitats consisted of circular huts, though evidence for full sedentism is lacking. Subsistence focused on hunting wild goats, sheep, and fallow deer, with possible gathering of wild barley and fruits, though plant consumption remains unclear. During the late Zarzian phase (or "post-Zarzian" or "proto-Neolithic"), associated with the Younger Dryas, a more sedentary lifestyle emerged, particularly in lower-lying areas. Sites like Shanidar and Zawi Chemi reflect this shift, with settlements becoming more concentrated, and a greater focus on plant-based subsistence.

In Mesopotamia, human occupation is obscured by alluvial deposits and flooding, but Mesolithic tools (e.g., microliths, scrapers) have been found in the Burgan hills of Kuwait. Towards the end of the period, sedentary villages appeared in the Upper Tigris, such as Demirköy, Körtiktepe, and Hallan Çemi, showing cultural ties to the Zarzian or possibly to the "Trialetian" culture, linked to sites in the southern Caspian.

In Central Anatolia, the Pınarbaşı site in the Konya region, dated to c. 13,000 BC, served as a camp for hunter-gatherers. Obsidian from the region suggests contact with the Natoufian Levant.

The Final Epipaleolithic of Cyprus is known from Aetokremnos, a site that yielded remains of dwarf hippopotamus, possibly linked to human activity. This suggests intensified subsistence strategies in response to cooling, though the Cypriot Epipaleolithic is still poorly understood, with limited connections to mainland cultures.

=== Neolithization phases (c. 10000–7000/6500 BC) ===
The Pre-Pottery Neolithic (PPN) marks the first phase of the Near Eastern Neolithic, initially defined by Kathleen Kenyon at Jericho (Tell es-Sultan) and divided into PPNA and PPNB, based on the absence of ceramics—unlike the European Neolithic, where pottery is a defining feature. This framework was later expanded with regional and chronological refinements, including a PPNC phase in the southern Levant.

==== Chronology and features ====
- Pre-Pottery Neolithic A (PPNA) - c. 10000/9600–9000/8800 BC: Characterized by regional diversity, the emergence of pre-domestic cultivation, circular architecture, and early village life. Evidence of incipient plant domestication appears, though hunting and gathering still dominate;
- Early PPNB - c. 9000/8800–8400 BC: Spread of the Neolithic across the Levant, southeast and central Anatolia, Cyprus, Upper Mesopotamia, and the Zagros. Early domestication of plants, beginnings of animal husbandry, especially goats and sheep; rectilinear architecture and ritual spaces appear;
- Middle PPNB - c. 8400–7500 BC: Consolidation of the agro-pastoral economy, with greater reliance on domesticated plants and animals. Village life intensifies, and new forms of settlement organization emerge;
- Late PPNB - c. 7500–7000/6400 BC: Domestication of key crops and animals is largely complete. Agriculture becomes mixed and intensive, combining cereals, legumes, goats, and sheep. Large villages ("megasites") emerge in the Levant and Anatolia. Early ceramics appear; long-distance trade (e.g. obsidian) and architectural complexity grow;

Pre-Ceramic Neolithic chronology and major features.
Chronological horizon	Approx. dating	Characteristics
Pre-Ceramic Neolithic A (PPNA)	10000/9500 - 9000/8800	Khiamian (Levant): early pre-Ceramic Neolithic; hunting and gathering; development of female figurines.; Mureybetian (Northern Levant): hunting and gathering, then pre-domestic agriculture, round architecture evolving to rectangular, community buildings.; Southeastern Anatolian PPNA: circular then rectangular dwellings, hunting and gathering then pre-domestic agriculture, monuments/sanctuaries.; Sultanian (Southern Levant): hunting and gathering, then pre-domestic agriculture, round architecture, monuments/sanctuaries.; Mesopotamia and western Zagros (Nemrikian and M'lefaatian): villages, hunting and gathering.; Central Zagros: no perennial architecture, hunting and gathering, pre-domestic agriculture?
Early Pre-Ceramic Neolithic B (PPNB)	9000/8800 - 8400	Pre-Ceramic Neolithic in the Levant, southeastern and central Anatolia, Cyprus, Upper Mesopotamia and the Zagros. Pre-domestic agriculture, first evidence of domesticated plants, persistence of hunting and gathering, beginning of animal husbandry at least in the northern Levant and southeastern Anatolia, probably also in the southern Levant and central Zagros; rectangular architecture, sanctuaries.
Middle Pre-Ceramic Neolithic B (PPNB)	8400 - 7500	Plant and animal domestication, development of the agro-pastoral economy, various subsistence and settlement practices, village development.
Late Pre-Ceramic Neolithic B (PPNB)	7500 - 7000/6400	Completion of domestication, expansion of agriculture and animal husbandry on a mixed basis based on cereals, legumes, goats and sheep, persistence of hunting and gathering; large-scale adoption of the Neolithic "package"; appearance of the "megasites" of the Levant and Anatolia, complexity of architecture; beginning of ceramics; long-distance trade (obsidian).

Across the PPN, the Neolithic lifestyle—permanent villages, agriculture, animal husbandry, advanced lithic technologies, lime plaster use, and complex social and ritual behaviors—gradually developed. By the end of the PPNB, most elements of the "Neolithic package" were in place. A cultural sphere or "Neolithic koinè" emerged, with shared traits across regions despite local differences. Scholars debate whether this originated from a core area—often the "Golden Triangle" (northern Levant, northern Jezirah, southeastern Anatolia)—or through a multiregional, interactive process without a single center of innovation.

Location of the main Pre-Ceramic Neolithic sites A.

==== Origins of Neolithization (c. 10000/9500–9000/8500 BC) ====
Location map of the main Neolithic ceramic sites in Mesopotamia and the western and central Zagros.

The Pre-Pottery Neolithic A (PPNA), and in part the Early Pre-Pottery Neolithic B (PPNB), represent the first stage of the Neolithic in the Levant, continuing directly from the Natoufian period, which ended around 9550 BC. This phase coincides with the end of the Younger Dryas and a shift toward a warmer, more humid climate, particularly pronounced in the northern Levant.

The transition from the Natoufian to the PPNA is represented by the Khiamian phase, found in the southern Levant and along the Middle Euphrates. It is notably characterized by the widespread use of "El Khiam points," small flint arrowheads found well beyond the Levant. The Khiamian evolved into the Sultanian in the southern Levant, which defines most of the PPNA in that area. In the northern Levant, the Mureybetian phase developed in parallel. The earlier term "Aswadian," previously used for the central Levant, is now largely abandoned.

These phases were marked by continued sedentarization, with more significant expansion in the Middle Euphrates than in the south. Villages in this area could reach two to three hectares in size. Habitation structures were initially circular, as in the Natoufian period, but during the second half of the 9th millennium BC, rectangular buildings began to appear, particularly in the Middle Euphrates. Sites like Jerf el Ahmar, Tell Abraq, and Mureybet show this architectural transition and also feature large non-domestic buildings likely used for communal or ritual purposes. The Jericho PPNA "tower," enclosed by a wall, belongs to the same architectural tradition, as does a ritual structure at Wadi Faynan 16. These developments suggest increasingly complex community structures and possibly the emergence of leaders or authority figures. In contrast, the southern Levant saw signs of demographic decline at the end of the PPNA and beginning of the PPNB, with evidence of site abandonments whose causes remain unclear, while the northern Levant experienced greater continuity.

In southeastern Anatolia, major Neolithic innovations also emerged during the PPNA. The sanctuary of Göbekli Tepe, with its monumental megalithic enclosures formed by T-shaped pillars, lacks signs of domestic use and is considered a ritual center. A similar site at Karahan Tepe has been identified nearby. After early developments at sites like Hallan Çemi, Körtiktepe, and Gürcütepe, the region saw the establishment of larger villages such as Nevalı Çori, Cafer Höyük, and Çayönü toward the end of the PPNA and beginning of the PPNB. These settlements also reflect a shift from circular to increasingly complex rectangular domestic architecture.

From a subsistence perspective, these communities were still hunter-gatherers but increasingly practiced what is now understood as pre-domestic agriculture. From at least 9500 BC, they began cultivating cereals and legumes in managed fields and likely attempted early forms of animal control. Although domesticated forms are not yet morphologically visible in the archaeological record, changes in dietary patterns and the spread of certain plants beyond their native habitats indicate the beginnings of farming.

On Cyprus, the PPNA is represented by sites like Ayia Varvara-Asprokremnos and Ayios Tychonas Klimonas, where hunting, particularly of wild boar, was central to subsistence. These sites show that the Neolithic sphere of influence extended to the island during this early period.

To the east, O. Aurenche and S. Kozlowski identify two cultural entities: the Nemrikian in the Iraqi and Eastern Jezirah, and the Mlefatian in the western Zagros. These succeeded the Zarzian and are known from a small number of village sites, such as Nemrik, Qermez Dere, and M'lefaat. These sites were composed of circular, semi-subterranean dwellings and were located in diverse ecological zones—highlands more focused on hunting and lowlands more reliant on plant gathering.

In the central Zagros, early sedentarization remains poorly documented, but progress has been made through excavations at sites like Sheikh-e Abad, Asiab, and Chogha Golan. early layers contain temporary camps rather than established buildings. Subsistence strategies were diverse and site-specific: Chogha Golan shows evidence of wild cereal use, while Sheikh-e Abad reveals the exploitation of nuts like walnuts and pistachios. Pre-domestic cultivation may have begun at Chogha Golan during this phase, potentially extending early agricultural activity well into the eastern regions of the Fertile Crescent.

Location of the main Pre-Ceramic Neolithic sites B.

==== Establishment of the Neolithic way of life (c. 9000/8500–7000/6400 BC) ====
The final phases of Neolithization in the Near East are represented by the Middle and Late Neolithic periods, which coincide with the climatic optimum of the early Holocene—a time marked by favorable environmental conditions for the development of agriculture. During this era, the Neolithic way of life spread rapidly across much of the region, with the northern Levant emerging as a particularly dynamic area.

In contrast, the southern Levant experienced a gap in settlement during the early Pre-Pottery Neolithic B (PPNB), though this was followed by a resurgence in the middle PPNB. Despite regional variations, this period marks the clearest evidence of a shared cultural sphere—a Near Eastern koinè—that integrated the northern and southern Levant, central and southeastern Anatolia, Cyprus, and parts of the Zagros. This cultural unification is reflected in widespread material exchanges, such as the distribution of Anatolian obsidian, and in signs of human mobility and shared practices.

The PPNB marks the consolidation of agricultural societies. It is during this time that indisputable signs of plant and animal domestication become visible, with multiple regions contributing to the emergence of agriculture. Domesticated cereals and legumes appear across the Levant, Cyprus, Anatolia, and the Zagros, pointing to independent or parallel developments. Animal domestication is initially most prominent in the northern Levant and southeastern Anatolia, though the domestication of goats also appears in the southern Levant and Zagros. Other domesticated animals appear in more southerly regions only after the end of the PPNB.

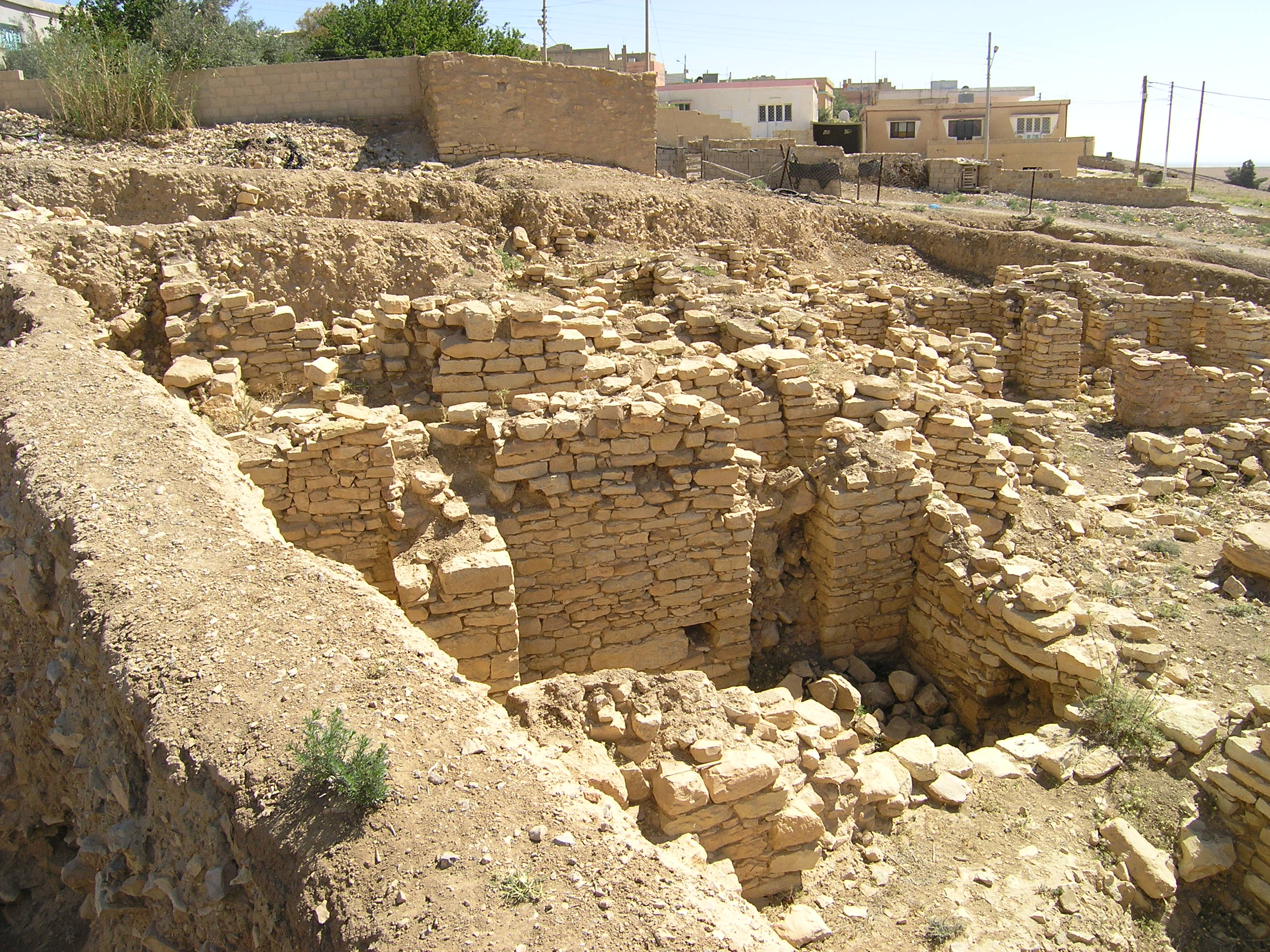
Ruins of Basta (Jordan).

This period saw the establishment of large, permanent villages that served as centers for agro-pastoralist communities. These settlements were typically composed of rectangular houses and featured increasingly sophisticated layouts. In the southern Levant, particularly in inland regions like the Jordan Valley and Transjordan, large sites such as 'Ain Ghazal developed, often exceeding 10 hectares in size. Similar growth occurred in the northern Levant, as at Abu Hureyra, and in southeastern Anatolia, where sites like Çayönü demonstrate architectural complexity and continued innovation.

In Cyprus, the PPNB is represented by Shillourokambos, Mylouthkia, and Akanthou. These communities clearly reflect Neolithic lifeways derived from the northern Levant, including agriculture and animal husbandry, though they retained regional architectural features like circular houses.

Central Anatolia also saw significant developments during this time, particularly in the Konya Plain at Aşıklı Höyük and Boncuklu. These settlements were near the Göllü Dağ obsidian sources, which contributed to regional exchange networks. Agriculture, especially cereal cultivation, appears to have begun here around 8300 BC, while animal domestication followed later. Farther south, Can Hasan III adds to the evidence for early sedentism in the region.

In eastern Upper Mesopotamia, the picture is less complete. Early sites such as Nemrik and Qermez Dere were abandoned during the PPNB, though Tell Maghzaliyah later emerged with evidence of rectangular architecture, adopted somewhat later than in the western regions.

The central Zagros also participated in this transformation, with several sites—such as Ganj Dareh, Jani, Tepe Guran, and Tepe Abdul Hosein—showing permanent architecture and the beginnings of the Neolithic economy. Though hunting and mobility remained part of life, domesticated plants and animals were increasingly present. In the second half of the 8th millennium BC, the Neolithic lifestyle spread throughout the Iranian plateau: to the southern Zagros (Ali Kosh, Chogha Bonut), to Fars and Kerman (Tepe Rahmatabad, Tell-e Atashi), and to the Alborz region (Tepe Sang-e Chakhmaq).

The end of the PPNB around 7000 BC is often seen as a turning point, sometimes described as a "Neolithic collapse" or "Palestinian hiatus" in the southern Levant. This phase is marked by the reduction or abandonment of many sites, accompanied by major cultural changes, especially the spread of pottery. Other shifts include new architectural styles and changes in settlement distribution. The causes remain debated—climate change, overpopulation, social conflict, disease, or some combination may all have played a role. Alternatively, this might represent a broader transformation in social organization and lifeways.

In the southern Levant, a continuation of the Pre-Pottery Neolithic occurred until around 6400 BC in a phase known as "Final Pre-Pottery Neolithic B" or "Pre-Pottery Neolithic C" (PPNC). This phase is best known at Ayn Ghazal, where no major discontinuity from the previous phase is observed, and at Atlit Yam, a coastal site that also preserves evidence of this transitional period.

Location of the main Late Neolithic sites mentioned.

=== Late Neolithic (c. 7000/6400–5300/4500 BC) ===
Situated between the "Neolithic Revolution" and the "Urban Revolution," the later part of the Near Eastern Neolithic—referred to as the "Ceramic" or "Late" Neolithic—has received comparatively less scholarly attention. As the name suggests, and in contrast to earlier phases, the onset of this period is marked by the appearance of ceramics during the first half of the 7th millennium BC, with regional variation in timing. This development is easily identifiable in the archaeological record but did not necessarily correspond to significant changes in the Neolithic way of life. Methodologically, cultures of this period are primarily distinguished by their ceramic types, which are typically named after the sites or regions where they were first identified (e.g., Halaf, Yarmouk).

From a geo-cultural perspective, the period is characterized by a shift in prominence from the Levantine region to the Mesopotamian plain, where increasing societal complexity eventually contributed to the emergence of the "Urban Revolution" several millennia later.

The conclusion of the Neolithic period, succeeded by the Chalcolithic ("Copper Age"), is dated differently across regions. These chronological differences often reflect scholarly perspectives rather than uniform material changes. In the southern Levant, the Neolithic period is considered to extend until approximately 4500 BC, while in Syria and Upper Mesopotamia, it is typically thought to end around 5500–5200 BC, during the so-called "Halaf-Ubaid transition", or earlier in some interpretations.

==== Southern Levant ====
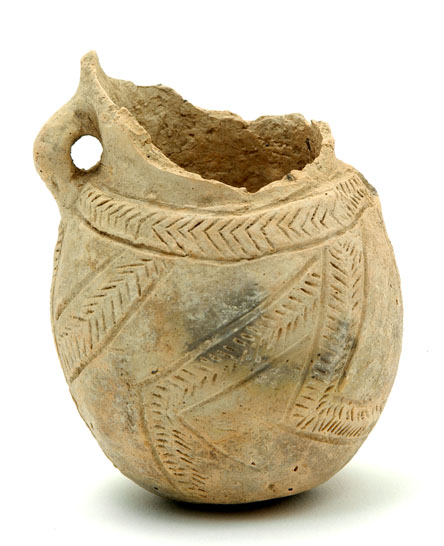
Yarmukian pottery from Sha'ar Hagolan.

The first ceramic Neolithic phase in the southern Levant displays many continuities with the final stages of the Pre-Pottery Neolithic B (PPNB Final or PPNC), with the notable exception of the introduction of pottery.

The earliest ceramic culture in the western part of the region is the Yarmukian (c. 6400–5800 BC), which also extended into parts of Jordan (e.g., Ayn Ghazal) and Lebanon (Byblos). Its main site is Sha'ar Hagolan in the central Jordan Valley, which covered approximately 20 hectares and featured streets and large courtyard houses. The pottery assemblage is diverse, and the artistic production is notable, including terracotta female figurines and small figurines on pebbles, with regional variation. Other regional cultures coexisted in the area, including the Jericho IX/Lod culture in the Judean lowlands and the Nizzanim culture on the southern coastal plain.

Some scholars consider the Neolithic of the southern Levant to have continued until 5000 BC (including the Wadi Rabah) or 4500 BC (including the Qatifian culture), while others classify these periods as part of the Early or Middle Chalcolithic. These differing interpretations may be reconciled by referring to this time as a transitional phase between the Neolithic and Chalcolithic periods. The Wadi Rabah culture, which followed the Yarmukian, appears to have been influenced by Halaf pottery traditions, possibly due to migration from northern regions. The Qatifian culture, identified in the southern part of the region (northern Negev), is characterized by limited permanent architecture, likely due to its seasonal herding settlements. Further north, an unnamed agro-pastoral culture is known, particularly from the site of Tel Tsaf.

==== Northern Levant, Syria and the Halaf culture ====
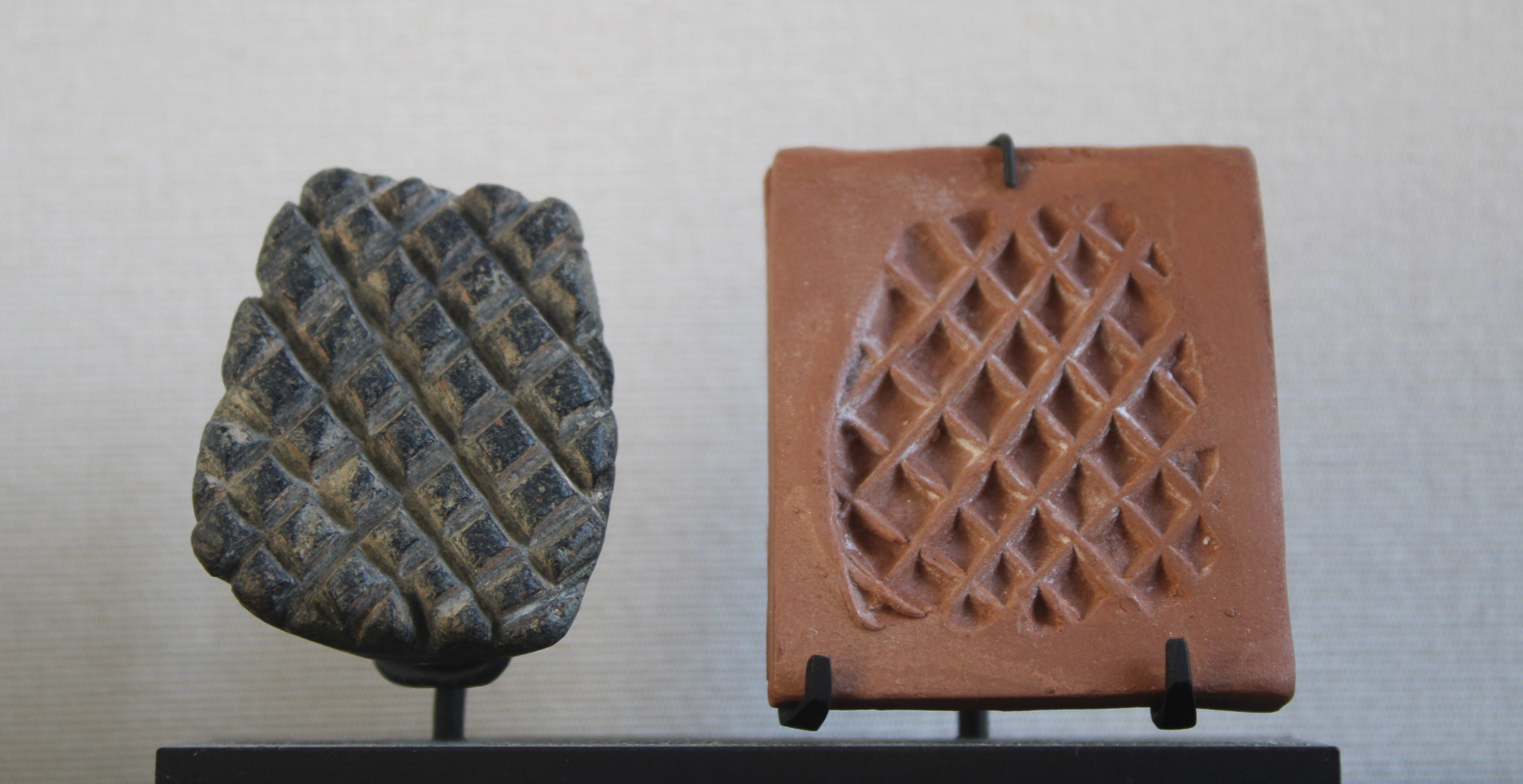
Seal from the Neolithic levels of Ras Shamra. Musée du Louvre.

In the northern Levant and eastern Syria, several sites remained occupied during the early Ceramic Neolithic, including Tell el-Kherk, while Ras Shamra is one of the few to show a hiatus. New settlements appeared in the region, such as Byblos, Tell Sukas, Hama, and Shir. Surveys in the Beqaa Valley indicate a significant number of sites dating to this period. In the Middle Euphrates region, although Mureybet was abandoned, sites such as Abu Hureyra, Tell Halula, and Mezraa Teleilat continued to be inhabited. Thus, the collapse traditionally associated with the end of the Pre-Pottery Neolithic B (PPNB) is not clearly evident in this area. While some site abandonments occurred in the late 7th and early 6th millennia BC, the chronology of the region remains poorly established, limiting a detailed understanding of settlement dynamics during the Late Neolithic.

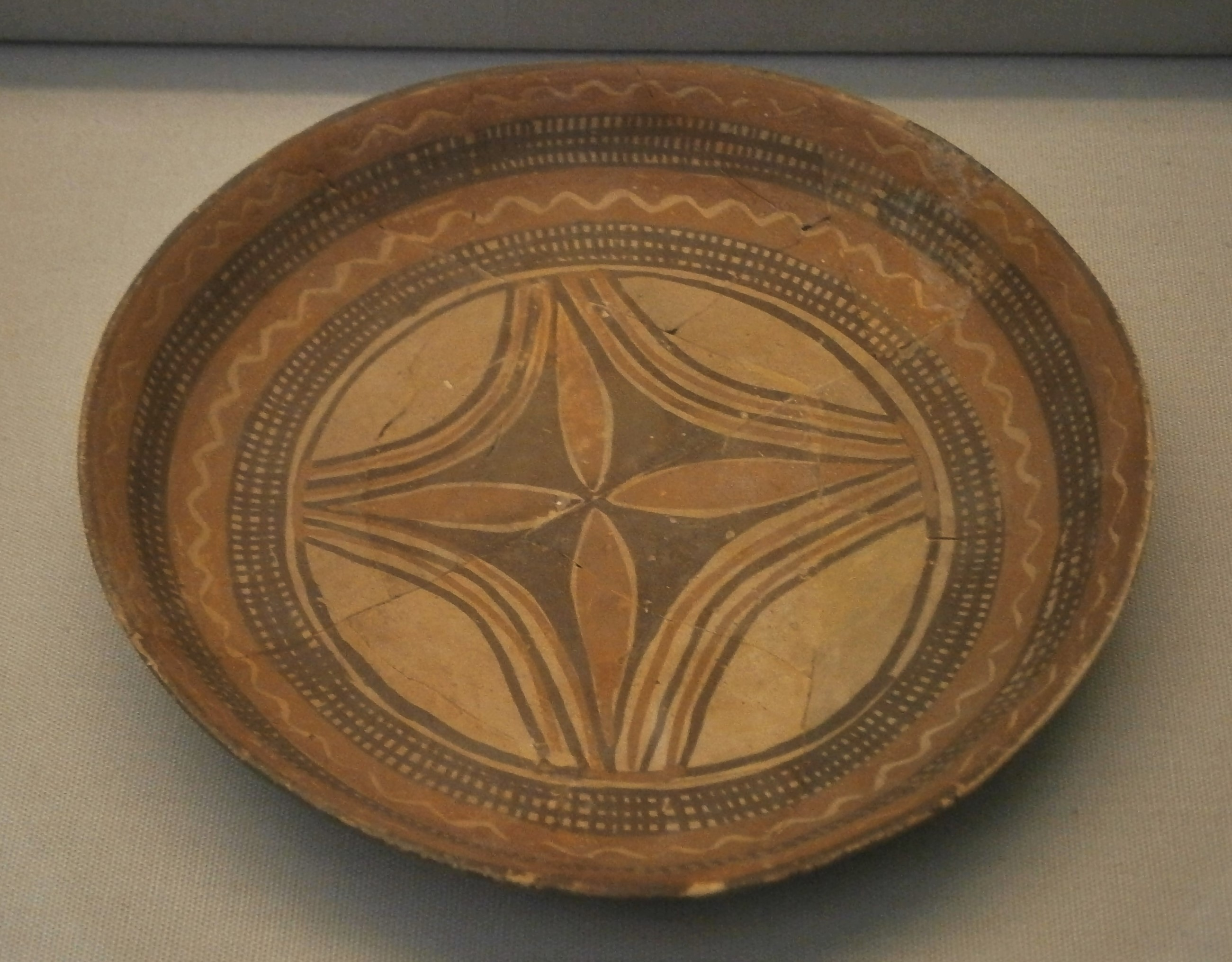
Dish with painted decoration, Late Halaf (c. 5600–5200 BC), Tell Arpachiyah. British Museum.

This period marked the beginning of the expansion of the Halaf culture, which was centered in Upper Mesopotamia. The emergence of pottery in the region is well documented at Tell Sabi Abyad, in the Balikh basin, around 7000 BC, corresponding to a "Proto-Halaf" phase. The Halaf culture proper developed after the transformations at the end of the 7th millennium BC. It is characterized by circular buildings known as "tholoi", multi-room collective structures likely used for storage, and distinctive bichrome and polychrome painted ceramics. Other significant developments include the use of seal-cachets, indicating a more complex economic organization, and spindle whorls, possibly reflecting increased textile production. Settlement patterns in the Jezirah during this period were often unstable, with most sites being small and short-lived.

By the mid-6th millennium BC, the Halaf culture had spread to northern Iraq (e.g., Tell Arpachiyah, Yarim Tepe II), where it succeeded the Samarra tradition, and to the Middle Euphrates (e.g., Shamsh-ed Din, Tell Amarna, Kosak Shimali), with aspects of its material culture also present west of the river. It extended into the high valleys of southeastern Anatolia, including sites such as Samsat; Tell Idlis, Tepecik (Makaraz Tepe), Tülintepe, and Korucutepe (now submerged by the Keban Dam lake). Further east, Domuztepe stands out as a major center of Halaf culture. M. Özdoğan regards this region as the most dynamic area within the Halaf cultural sphere. However, the origins of the Halaf culture remain debated, although its ceramic tradition appears to have developed in northern Mesopotamia.

==== Cyprus ====
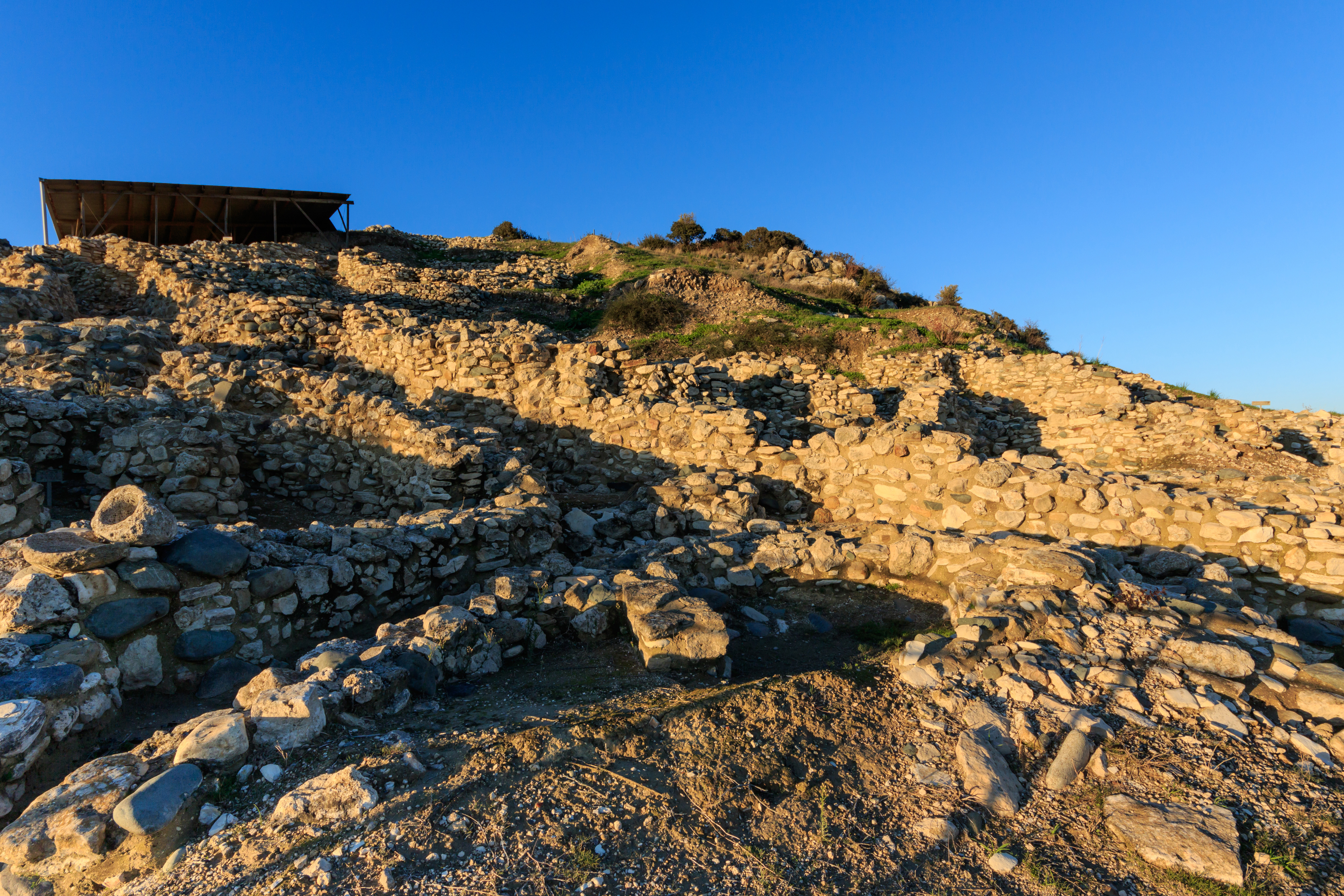
The Khirokitia site.

During the 7th millennium BC, Cyprus remained in the pre-ceramic phase. The principal site is Khirokitia, located on the southern coast, which is the largest known settlement of the period. Other sites include smaller permanent villages such as Tenta, Troulloi, and Kastros, as well as seasonal sites like Ortos, Dhali, and Kataliontas. These settlements were generally established in naturally protected locations; Khirokitia, for example, is situated on a promontory bordered by a meandering river, with a wall reinforcing the natural defenses. This suggests a relatively advanced level of organization at Khirokitia compared to other sites on the island. Nonetheless, concerns for security appear evident across the island. The economy was agro-pastoral and was supplemented by deer hunting and fishing. This phase came to an abrupt end around 5500 BC, after which there is no evidence of habitation for several centuries. The causes of this abandonment remain unclear. Following a hiatus of approximately one millennium, the Sothira culture emerged, introducing ceramics across the island. This phase is considered part of the Late Neolithic. The economic base remained similar to that of the earlier period, with the addition of cultivated fruit trees such as fig and olive, as well as grapevines.

==== Anatolia ====
Catalhöyük, the first large settlement of mankind

Southeastern Anatolia is generally included within the Syro-Mesopotamian cultural horizon. In Central Anatolia, numerous Neolithic sites emerged, including Hacilar and Erbaba in the Pisidian Lakes region, and Süberde and Çatalhöyük in the Konya Plain. Çatalhöyük, which followed sites such as Boncuklu and Aşıklı Höyük, is the most prominent site of the period. It is notable for its richly decorated houses, which featured wall paintings, bucrania (bull skulls), and figurines. These structures are generally not interpreted as temples. The agro-pastoral economy was well established, and the earliest monochrome ceramics likely appeared in the region by the end of the 7th millennium BC. This period marked the consolidation and expansion of the Anatolian Neolithic, extending westward and northwestward, as evidenced by sites along the Aegean and Marmara coasts (associated with the Fikirtepe culture). In contrast, no Neolithic sites have been identified in northern Anatolia, possibly due to the absence of a sedentary lifestyle in that region or gaps in the archaeological record. From the final centuries of the 6th millennium BC, painted pottery began to appear, including some high-quality examples. Neolithic expansion in western Anatolia continued until a rupture occurred around 6000–5800 BC, visible across much of the Anatolian plateau. This period is marked by the spread of a new type of pottery characterized by dark, polished surfaces with incised or grooved decoration, the origin of which remains uncertain.

==== Development of Mesopotamia ====
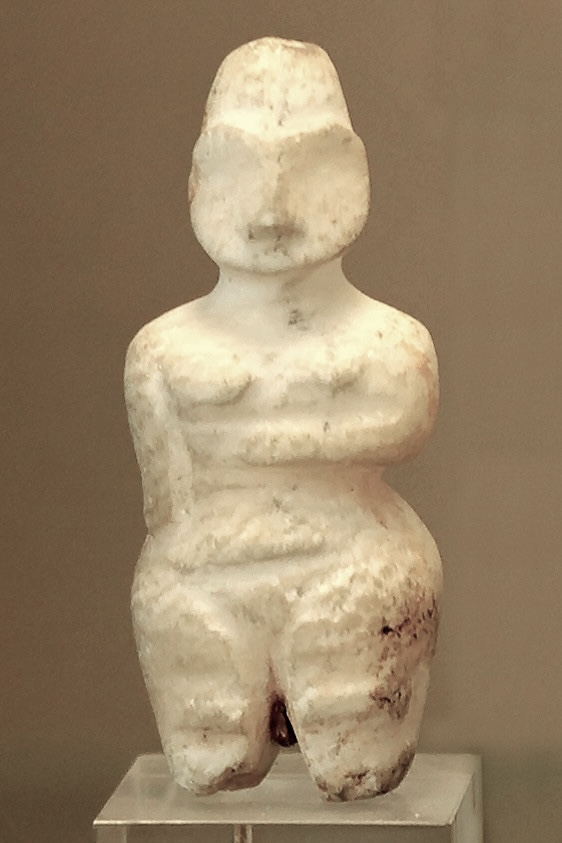
Female figurine in alabaster, Tell es-Sawwan, Samarra period. Musée du Louvre.

In the alluvial plains of Mesopotamia, many Neolithic sites are likely inaccessible due to their proximity to river systems, which have historically served as major settlement axes. These sites are often buried beneath river sediments or lie beneath later urban layers, as many locations were continuously inhabited into historic periods. For example, at Nineveh, test excavations have revealed evidence of occupation dating back to the second half of the 7th millennium BC. As a result, only a limited number of Neolithic villages are currently known from this region. These tend to be sites that were abandoned during the Neolithic and are typically located away from major waterways.

The earliest ceramic culture in northern Mesopotamia is the Hassuna culture, which was preceded by a "Proto-Hassuna" or "Archaic Hassuna" phase, also known as "Umm Dabaghiyah" (c. 7000–6500 BC). This early phase is characterized by ceramics decorated with simple red-painted motifs and is attested at sites such as Yarim Tepe, Bouqras, Umm Dabaghiyah, and Tell es-Sawwan in central Mesopotamia; similar material is also found in the Syrian Jezirah. During the Hassuna period (c. second half of the 7th millennium BC), sites such as Hassuna, Yarim Tepe, and Telul eth-Thalathat exhibit more complex house plans and the introduction of collective granaries. This was followed by the Samarra period (c. 6200–5700 BC), characterized by finely painted ceramics, especially evident in central Mesopotamia at sites such as Tell es-Sawwan and Choga Mami. The ceramics of this phase represent an evolution of the earlier tradition and are also found in the Syrian Jezirah. The Samarra period is marked by architectural innovations such as tripartite houses and the earliest evidence of irrigation canals. The use of seals and signs of social stratification, such as those observed in the Tell es-Sawwan necropolis, suggest increasing social complexity. In the 6th millennium BC, Upper Mesopotamia became part of the Halaf cultural sphere (e.g., Tell Arpachiyah, Yarim Tepe II).

The earliest known site in southern Mesopotamia is Tell el-'Oueili, which was occupied from the end of the 7th millennium BC. The site features elaborate architecture, including an 80 m² granary and residential structures up to 240 m² in size, and provides evidence of irrigated agriculture—essential in a region where natural rainfall is insufficient for dry farming. It remains uncertain whether southern Mesopotamia was first settled during this period or earlier, as the region's complex geological history complicates interpretation. During the early Neolithic, the coastline of the Persian Gulf was significantly lower than today. Sea levels then rose due to glacial melt at the onset of the Holocene, submerging earlier settlements, before retreating again from the 4th millennium BC as river sedimentation reshaped the landscape. To date, no pre-Samarra ceramics have been found at Lower Mesopotamian sites. However, lithic tools similar to those of the Pre-Pottery Neolithic B (PPNB) have been recovered on the western margins of the desert. Ultimately, southern Mesopotamia gave rise to two of the most influential Chalcolithic cultural traditions in the Middle East—the Ubaid and Uruk cultures. These played a central role in the development of urbanism and state formation, marking the transition from Prehistory to History.

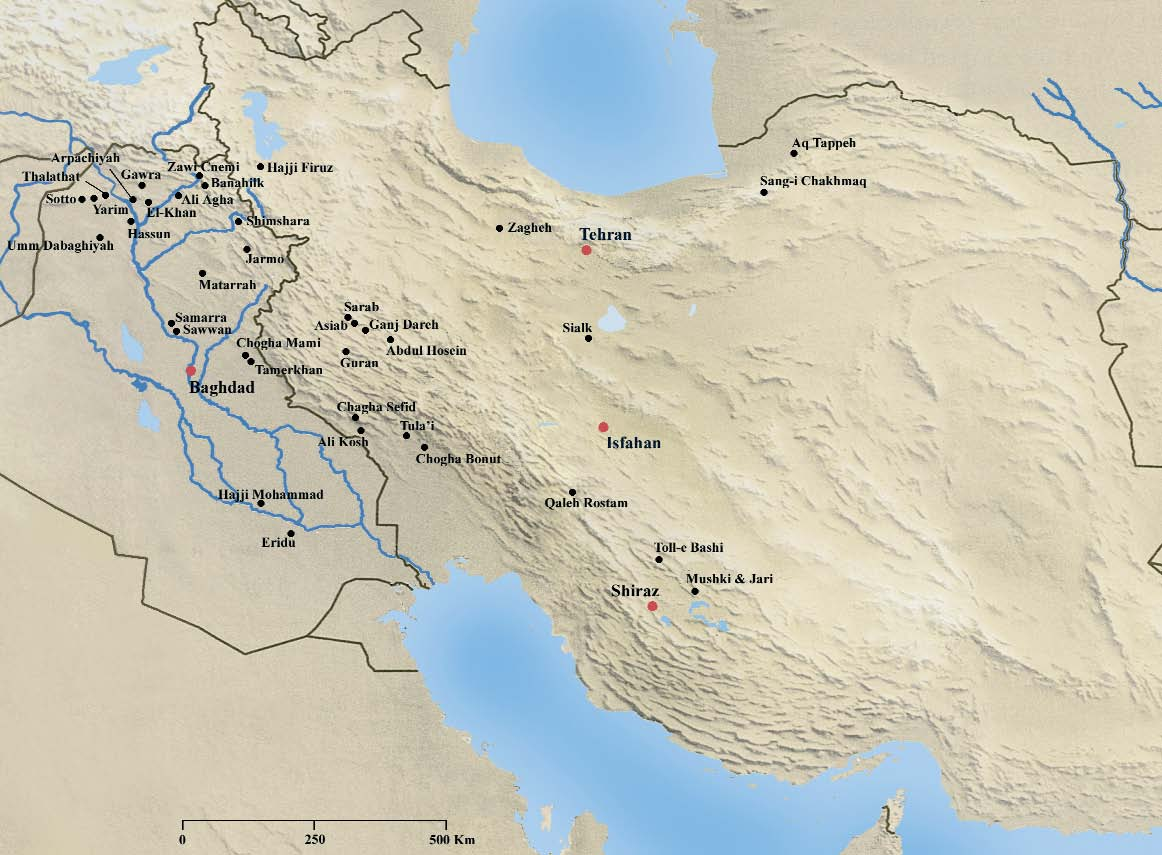
Location of the main Neolithic sites in the Zagros and Iranian plateau.

==== Zagros and Iranian plateau ====
Following the abandonment of earlier sites at the beginning of the 7th millennium BC, a new pattern of settlement emerged in the Zagros region. Several sites illustrate the transition between the pre-ceramic and ceramic Neolithic phases, including Ganj Dareh, Tepe Abdul Hosein, and Tepe Guran in the upper valleys, as well as Chogha Bonut and Chogha Golan in the lower areas. Other sites appear to represent new foundations, such as Jarmo in the Chemchemal Valley (Iraq), Sarab and Siahbid in Mahidasht, and Chogha Mish in Susiana. The expansion of Neolithic lifeways became more pronounced in the 6th millennium BC, with the emergence of numerous sites in areas that had already adopted Neolithic practices, such as Fars and Kerman (e.g., Tal-e Mushki, Tal-e Jari, and later Tepe Yahya), as well as in newly settled regions. These include the Lake Urmia (Hajji Firuz), the central plateau (Tepe Sialk Nord), and the Tehran plain (Cheshmeh Ali). Sites south of the Caspian Sea display cultural affinities with the Jeitun culture of Turkmenistan, the earliest known Neolithic culture of Central Asia. Given the wide geographical distribution of these sites, the ceramics of the Final Iranian Neolithic are highly diverse, although they share a common technological and stylistic foundation, often referred to as the "soft-ware horizon." The Neolithic economy was based on the cultivation of cereals and legumes and the domestication of goats and sheep. However, hunting continued to play a significant role in some areas, as evidenced by remains of gazelle, hemione, and aurochs in Susiana.

== Sedentarization, domestication, and technical innovations ==
=== Settlement and habitat: sedentarization and the first villages ===
Sedentary life, which implies a permanent habitat, is opposed in this respect to mobility, which implies a temporary or seasonal habitat. Acquired as early as the Natoufian, this character differentiates the Near East from the surrounding regions, and is reflected in the presence of villages, centers of territories that may also include temporary dwellings (camps).

— O. Aurenche and S. Kozlowski, 2015

Several archaeological indicators point to the presence of sedentary communities: permanent architecture with evidence of reconstruction, storage structures such as silos, heavy furniture, polished stone tools, and the accumulation of material remains. Additional clues include the year-round presence of domesticated or commensal animals (e.g., house mice, sparrows), cemeteries in proximity to settlements, and the seasonal distribution of animal remains suggesting year-round occupation. The definition of sedentism is debated—whether it requires the entire community to reside permanently in one place or whether it is sufficient for the majority to do so, with some members remaining seasonally mobile. In practice, mobility and sedentariness often coexisted, and their boundaries were fluid during these early periods. The shift toward sedentarization brought significant changes, including transformations in activity patterns, reproduction, diet, division of labor, trade networks, health, and belief systems.

The beginnings of this transition are visible in the southern Levant during the Early Natufian phase (c. 12,500–11,500 BC), the final stage of the Epipaleolithic. The first seemingly permanent villages emerged, consisting of small, rounded dwellings, as seen at sites such as Mallaha, Hayonim, and Wadi Hammeh 27. However, these groups retained a degree of mobility, continuing to occupy seasonal hunting and gathering camps. During the Late Natufian phase (c. 11,500–10,000 BC), sedentarization declined in the southern Levant but became more established further north, particularly in the Middle Euphrates region (e.g., Mureybet, Abu Hureyra). These fluctuations appear to correlate at least partially with climatic changes: the expansion of sedentism coincided with the warmer Bølling-Allerød period, while its retreat coincided with the cooler Younger Dryas. However, the exact nature of this relationship remains debated. Sedentary settlement became dominant in the subsequent Pre-Pottery Neolithic A (PPNA, c. 10,000–9,000 BC), which saw the consolidation of village life in the Levant (e.g., Jericho, Mureybet, Jerf el Ahmar) and its expansion into neighboring regions such as southeastern Anatolia (e.g., Çayönü, Hallan Çemi, Körtik Tepe) and Upper Mesopotamia (e.g., Nemrik, Qermez Dere, M'lefaat). The following phase, Pre-Pottery Neolithic B (PPNB, c. 9000–7000/6400 BC), continued this trend despite some disruptions. It witnessed the emergence of large settlements such as Ayn Ghazal and Basta in Jordan and Abu Hureyra and Halula in Syria. This period also saw the introduction of non-domestic structures, likely used for communal or ritual purposes. Some entire sites, such as Göbekli Tepe in southeastern Anatolia, appear to have served primarily ritual functions.

Neolithic villages varied widely in size and layout depending on region and period. Some settlements occupied less than one hectare, while others extended over fifteen hectares or more. Over time, settlement areas generally increased, and in some regions, a hierarchy of sites developed, with larger villages serving as central places—although no true towns are identified for this period. Villages were primarily composed of domestic dwellings, but also included open areas possibly used as communal spaces, defensive structures such as walls and dykes, and buildings dedicated to collective functions such as meetings, religious practices, or storage.

In the earliest phases of the Neolithic, houses were typically rounded and semi-subterranean. From approximately 8500 BC, rectangular structures began to appear, first in the northern Levant and subsequently in adjacent areas. This shift coincided with the development of mudbrick construction and other masonry techniques. During the Pre-Pottery Neolithic B (PPNB), various house plans evolved across different regions, often resulting in complex layouts and larger dwellings, some featuring upper floors. This architectural transformation reflects the growing importance of the house as a structured domestic space. Rooms may have served specific functions, and the house increasingly represented a particular family group and its private living environment.

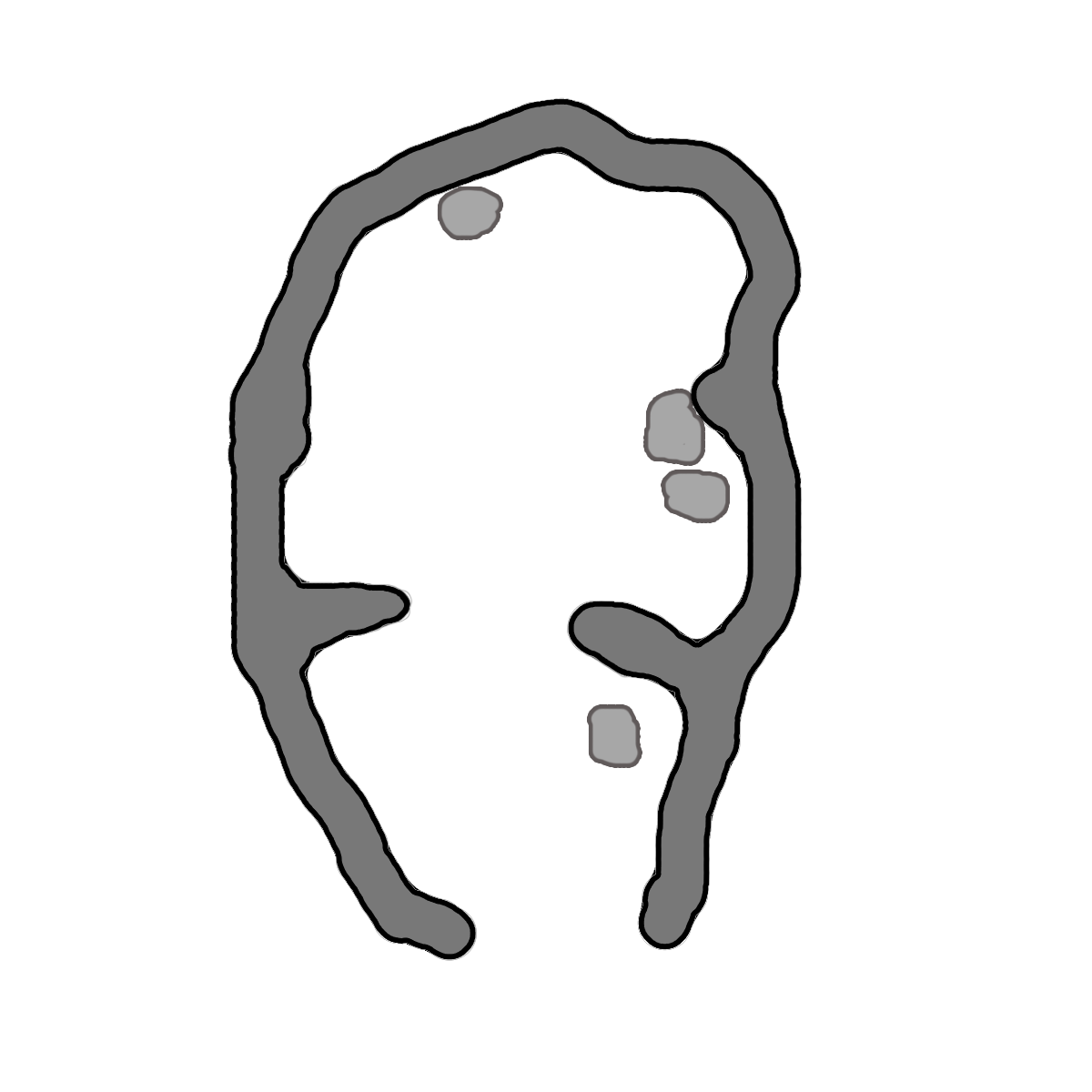
Plan of a typical PPNA circular house, with interior fireplaces.

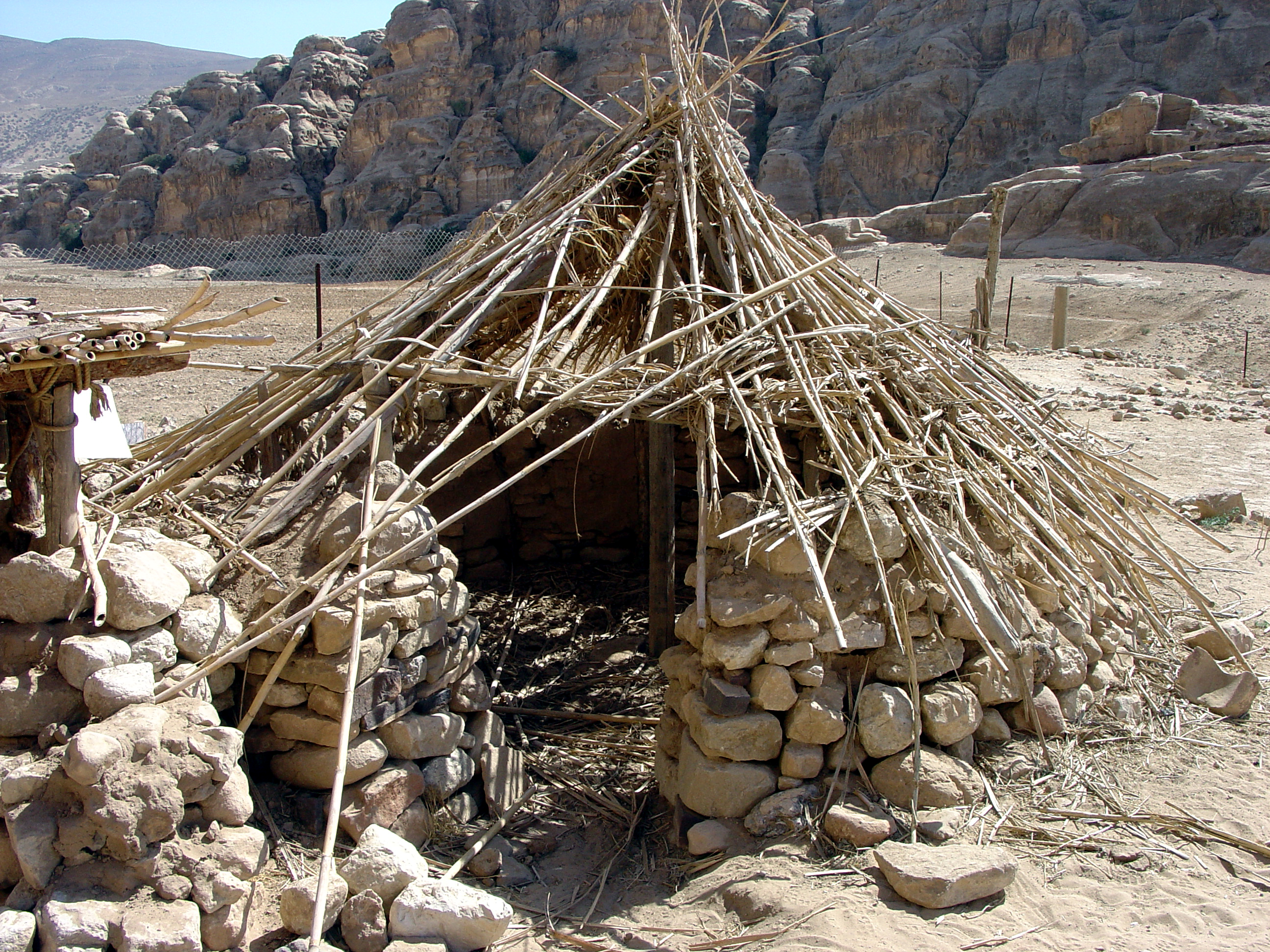
Reconstruction of an early PPNB semi-buried round house in Beidha, Jordan.

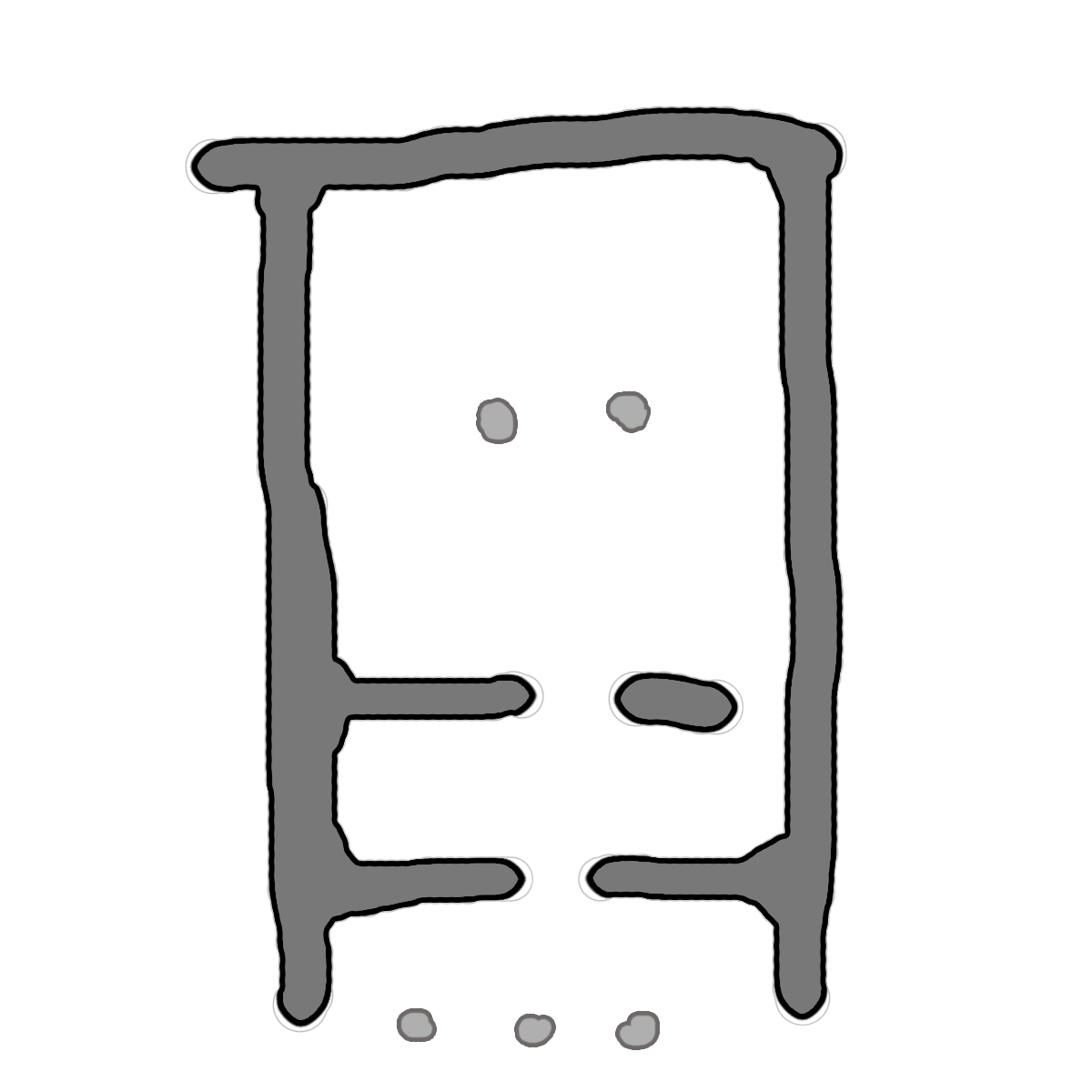
Plan of a simple rectangular house in the South Levant (Jericho).

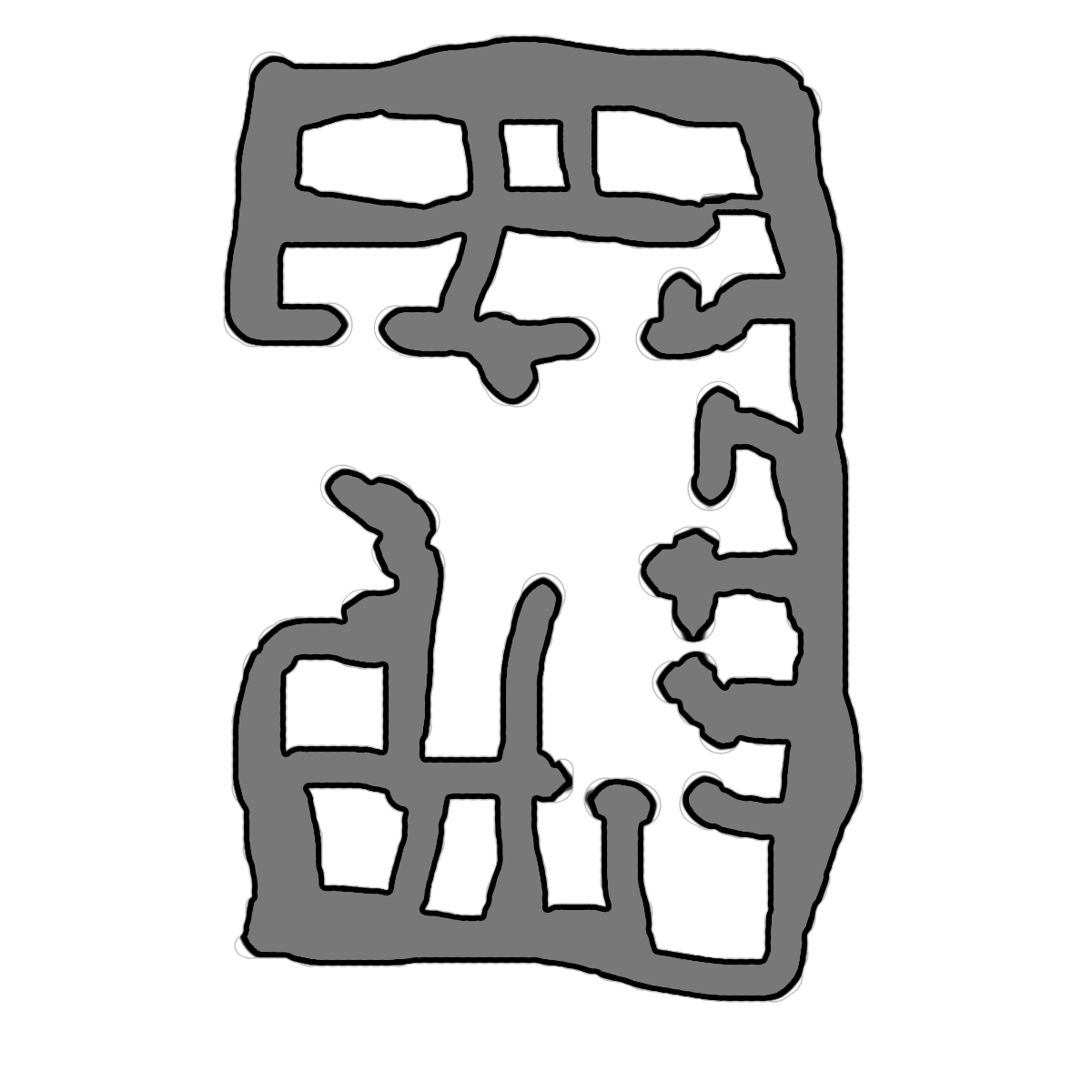
Plan of a courtyard house in the South Levant (Basta).

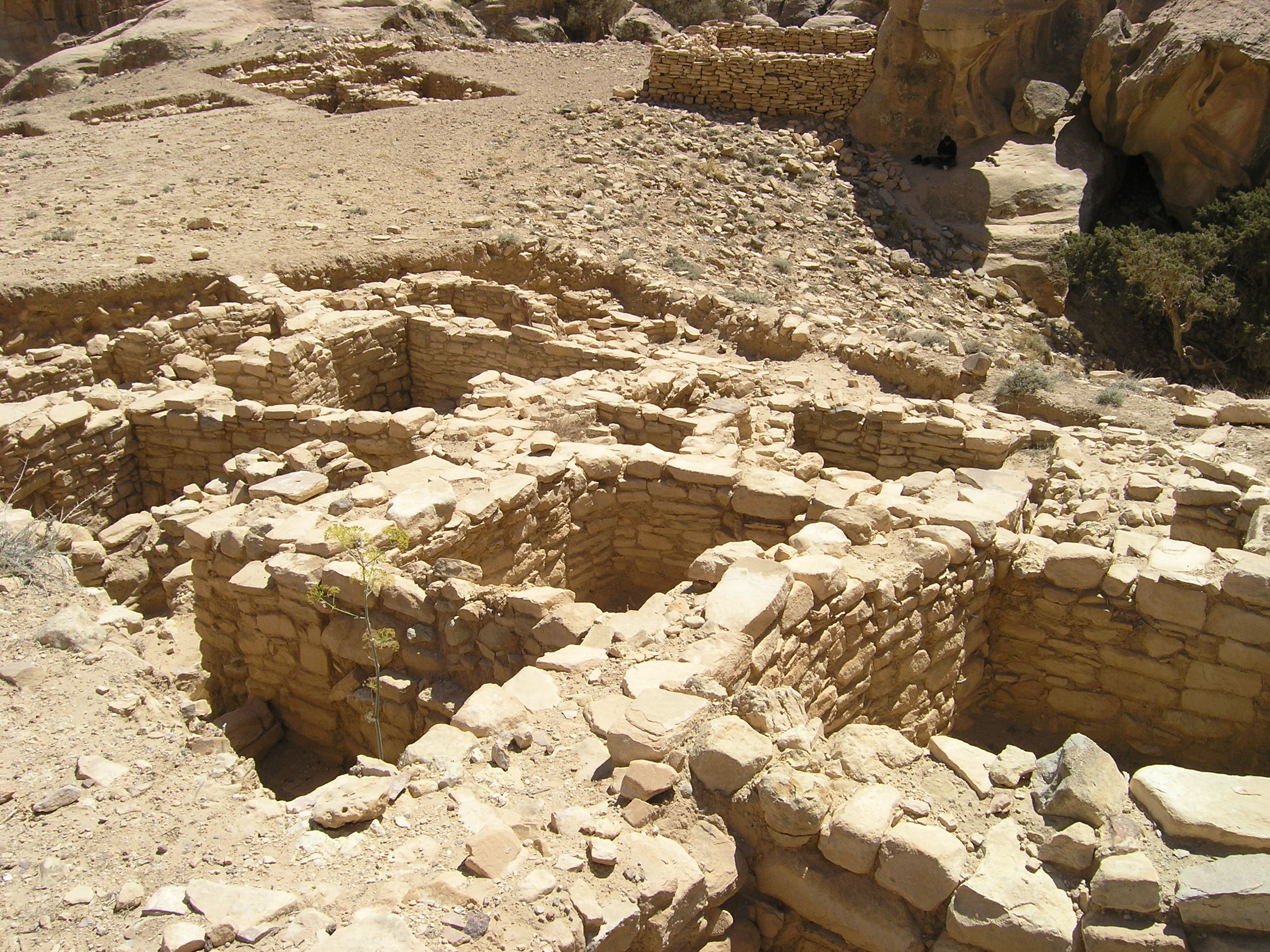
Ruins of late PPNB buildings on the Ba'ja site in Jordan.

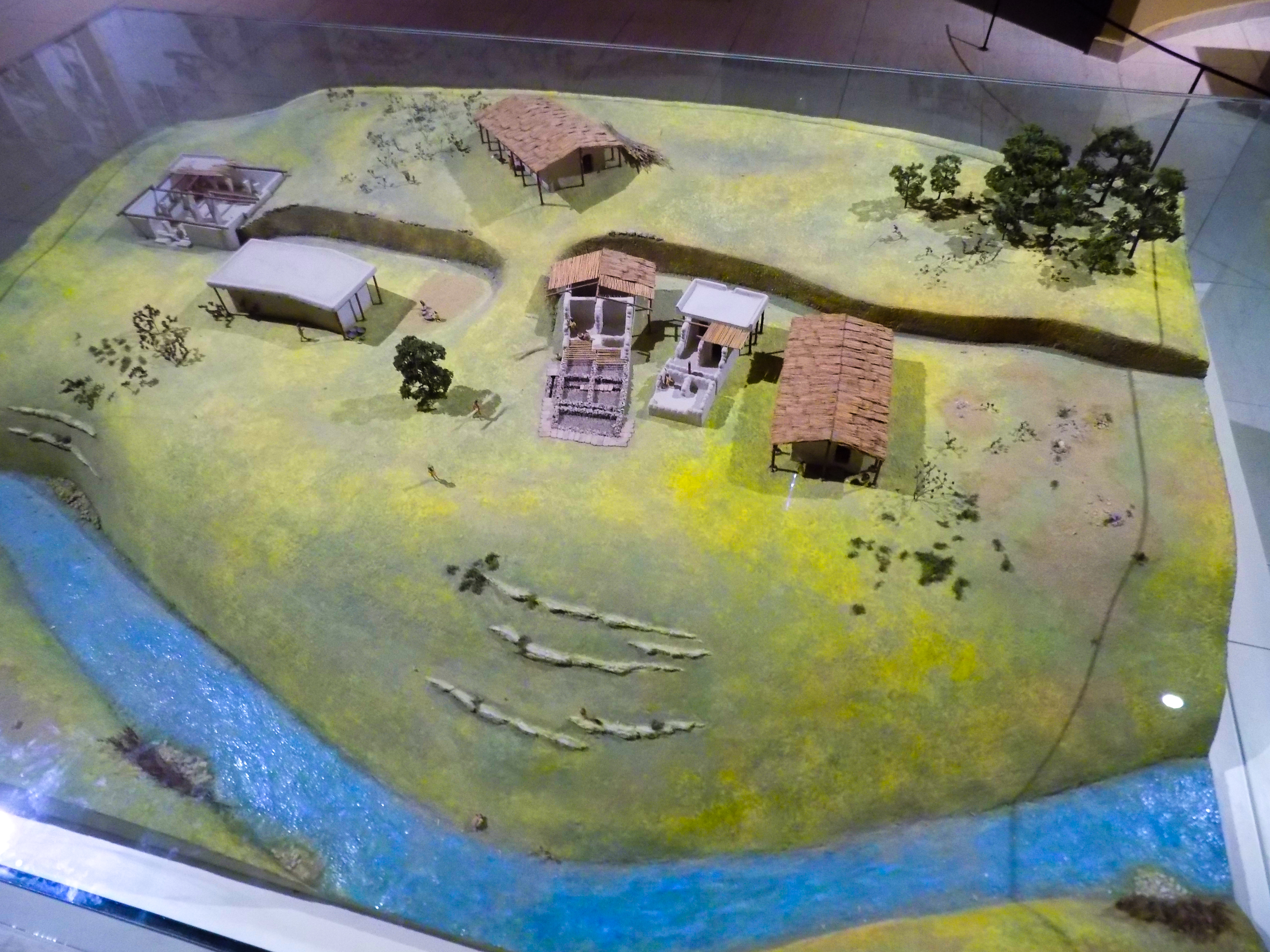
Model of the Nevalı Çori site at the Şanlıurfa Archaeological Museum.

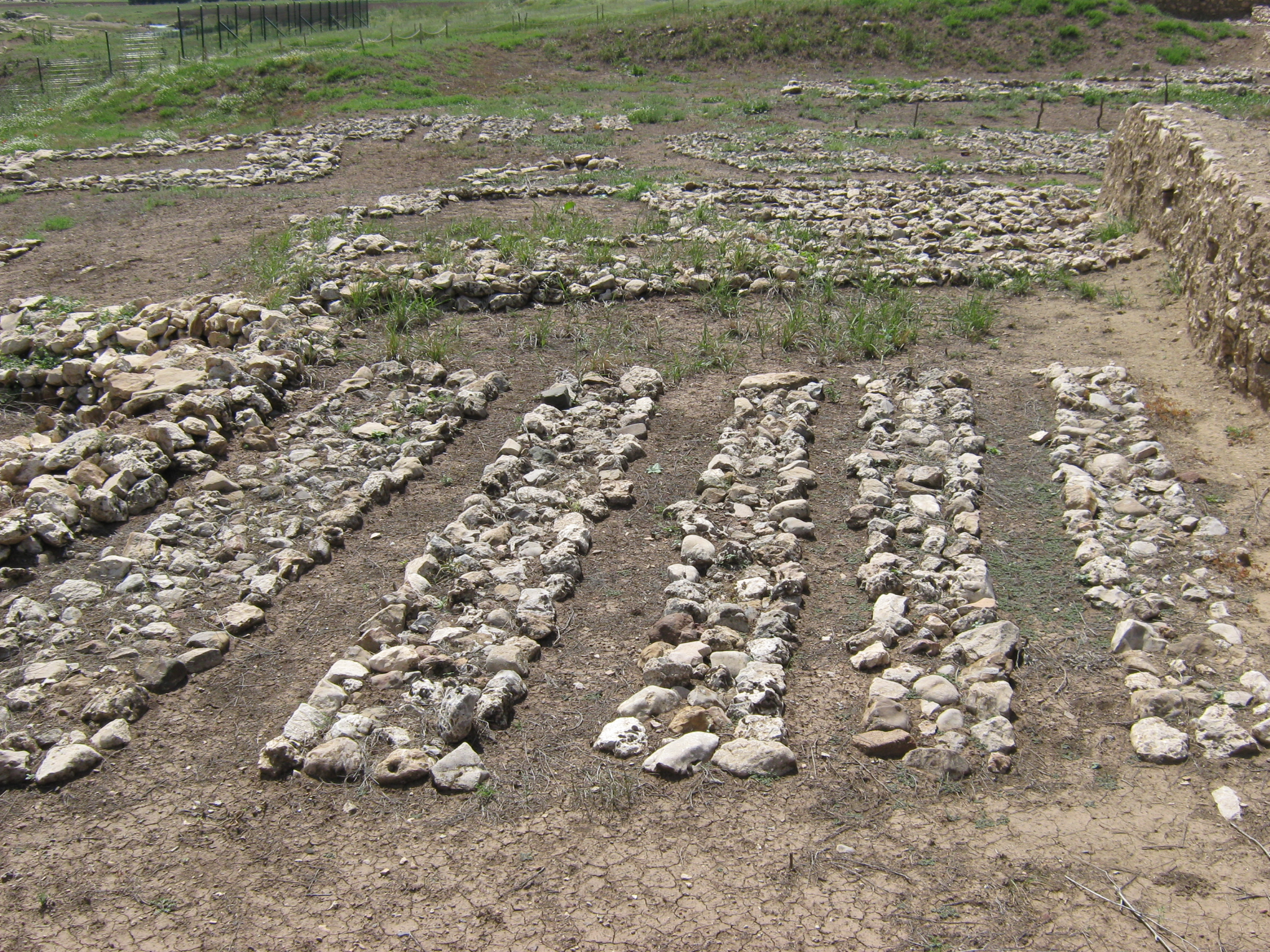
Grill plan house base, Çayönü.

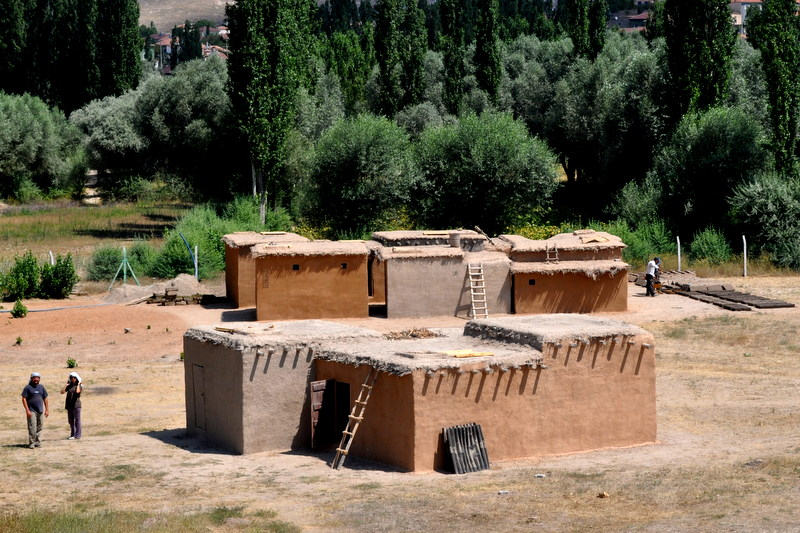
Reconstruction of rectangular Neolithic houses at Aşıklı Höyük in Central Anatolia.

Large-scale settlements are also characteristic of the Ceramic Neolithic. Çatalhöyük in Central Anatolia, for example, covered approximately 13.5 hectares and featured a dense arrangement of houses accessed through the roof. Population estimates for the site vary, ranging from roughly 3,500 to as many as 8,000 inhabitants. In the southern Levant, Sha'ar Hagolan extended over 20 hectares and was organized around a network of streets separating large residential buildings. In the Late Halaf period (c. 5500 BC), Domuztepe in Upper Mesopotamia also exceeded 20 hectares and may have housed between 1,500 and 2,000 people. However, smaller sites such as Tell Arpachiyah (c. 1.5 hectares), while more modest in scale, featured significant architectural elements, including communal buildings, that indicate their regional importance.

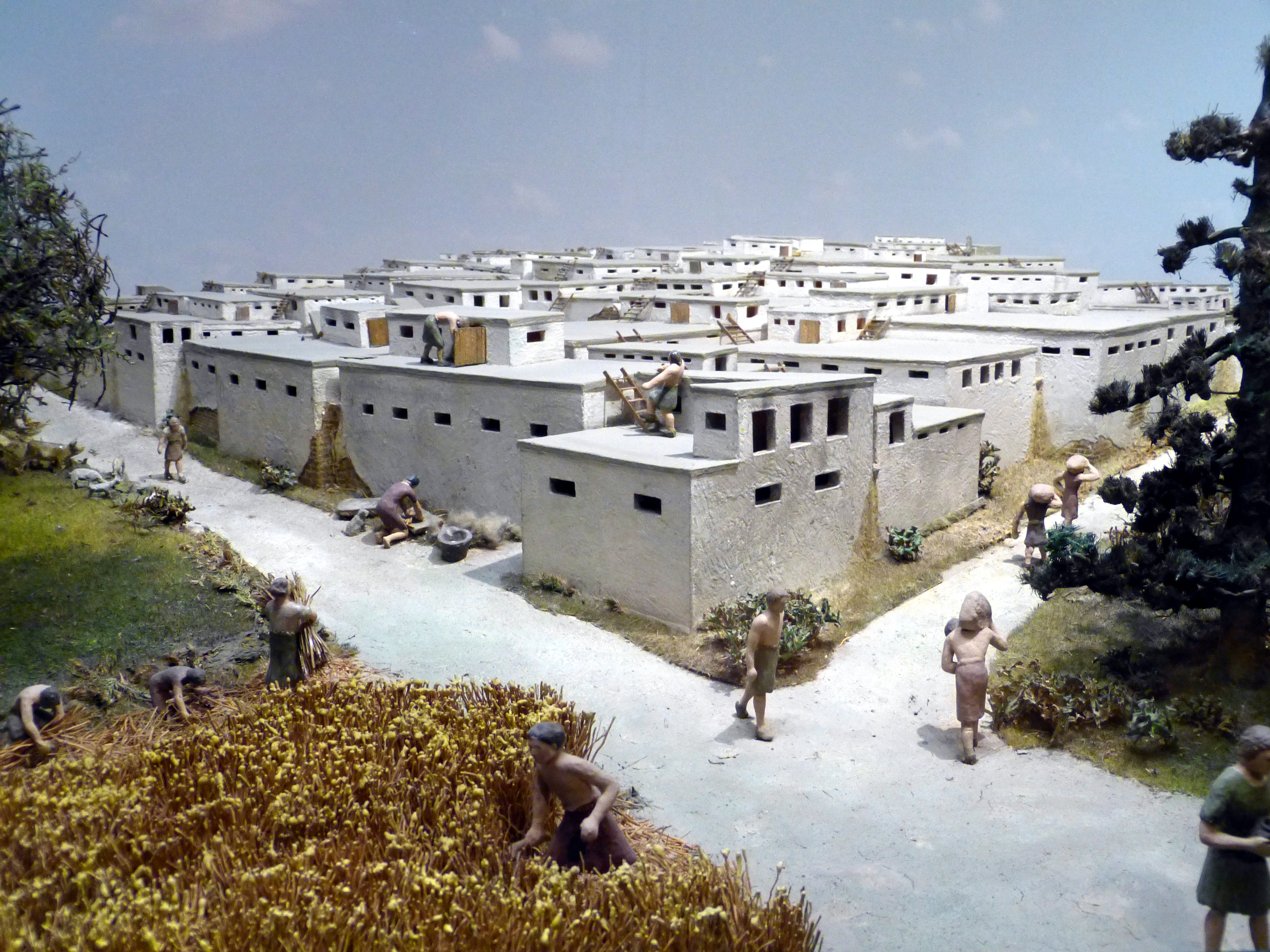
Model of the Çatal Höyük site, Thuringian Museum of Prehistory.

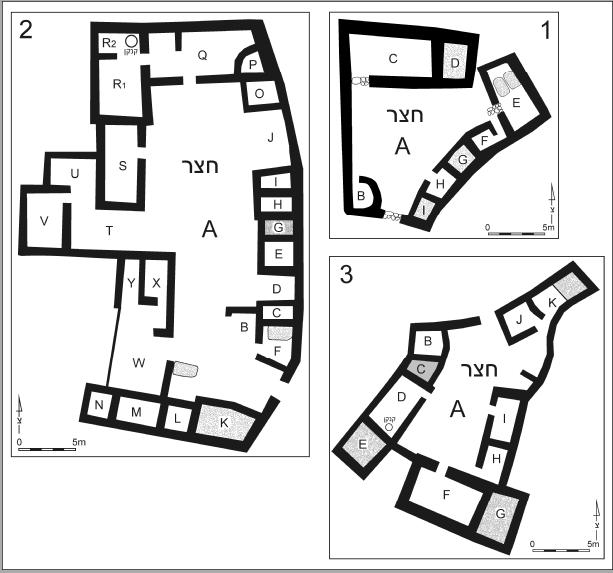
Plans of Sha'ar Hagolan's courtyard residences.

=== Domestication: the birth of agriculture and animal husbandry ===
According to G. Willcox, plant cultivation can be defined as “assisting the reproduction and consequent multiplication of plants,” while domestication refers specifically to “the selection of cultivar traits, for example the loss of the dispersal mechanism". D. Helmer defines animal domestication as “the control of an animal population through the isolation of the herd, with the loss of panmixia, the suppression of natural selection, and the application of artificial selection based on particular traits, either behavioral or cultural. Animals become the property of the human group and are dependent on it".

The earliest cultivated plants in the Near East, often referred to as the "founder crops," comprise a group of at least nine species. These include cereals—barley, emmer wheat, and einkorn—and legumes—lentils, broad beans, vetches, peas, and chickpeas—as well as flax. Following the domestication of the dog, the first domesticated animals were the primary ungulates: sheep, goats, pigs, and cattle. The domestic cat is also attested in the archaeological record during the Neolithic period.

Location of identified foci of cereal domestication in the Near East: pre-domestic agriculture (italics) and morphological domestication (right).

Domestication in the Near East took place over a period extending roughly from 9500 to 8500 BC, with unequivocal morphological evidence of domesticated plants and animals becoming clear in the second half of the 9th millennium BC. Earlier indicators—such as an increase in the proportion of later-domesticated plant species consumed, the presence of commensal animals like mice and sparrows, greater quantities of straw, and patterns in the age of slaughtered animals—suggest the beginnings of domestication in prior centuries. These developments have been identified at numerous sites, notably in the northern Levant and southeastern Anatolia, as well as in the southern Levant, the Zagros region, and on Cyprus. Consequently, domestication did not originate from a single center. Before full domestication, humans exploited plants and animals through gathering and hunting, alongside forms of pre-domestic control, as the knowledge and techniques necessary for domestication were already in use by the end of the Palaeolithic. A sedentary or semi-sedentary lifestyle, established during the Epipaleolithic, preceded domestication and is no longer regarded as its result. Climatic changes during the transition from the Late Pleistocene to the Holocene coincided with the domestication process and likely influenced it. Agriculture and animal husbandry developed in regions where wild forms of domesticates were naturally present and where other food resources were also abundant. Multiple explanations for the origins of domestication have been proposed, though no single theory has achieved consensus. It is now generally accepted that a combination of factors—climatic conditions, demographic pressures, economic reasoning, biological responses of plants and animals, social dynamics, and changes in symbolic or religious worldviews—must be considered.

Agriculture did not dominate the subsistence of societies that domesticated plants from the very beginning, far from it. In the early times, hunting and gathering remained important. The communities that developed agriculture often had mixed economies, combining a significant proportion of foraging and cultivation. Depending on the location, the importance of agriculture in subsistence varies greatly. It was only in the late phases of the PPNB and even more in the Ceramic Neolithic that it became dominant on a majority of sites. Early Neolithic agriculture was likely practiced on small plots resembling gardens, where multiple crops were cultivated together. These plots were worked intensively with human-powered tools such as hoes. Most early agriculture was rain-fed (dry farming), but irrigation techniques gradually emerged, enabling the expansion of farming into new areas, notably the Mesopotamian plains where rainfall was insufficient. From the outset, agriculture was closely linked with livestock herding in an agro-pastoral economic system. The development of pastoral nomadism, facilitated by the domestication of animals, played a significant role in shaping mobile lifestyles, particularly in semi-arid regions, where groups moved with large herds of sheep and goats. Hunting continued alongside domestication and remained important in some contexts. In the final stages of the Pre-Pottery Neolithic B (PPNB), for example, the Jordanian desert saw the emergence of large-scale gazelle hunting using communal traps known as "desert kites," associated with seasonal camps and ritual structures. These practices reflect alternative models of community development that did not follow the conventional trajectory of Neolithization.

=== Industry and technical progress ===
Material production during the Near Eastern Neolithic involved the use of a wide range of raw materials. However, due to the preservation conditions of Middle Eastern sites, perishable materials such as skins, wood, reeds, and plant and animal fibers have generally not survived, making it difficult to study their processing. The surviving materials are primarily stone, plaster, clay, bone, and, to a lesser extent, metal ores. The industries associated with these materials are characterized by distinct workflows, from the extraction of raw materials to the production and use of finished products. Researchers are actively working to reconstruct these processes.

The Neolithic period saw significant advancements in material production across various fields.

- Flintknapping: There was a marked improvement in flintknapping techniques, leading to the production of more sophisticated tools, including elongated blades (notably naviform laminar cutting), arrowheads, and tools to support the emerging agricultural economy, such as sickles, knife blades, and bifacial axes.
- Polished stone: Polished stone was used to create a variety of tools, including axes, grinding equipment (such as millstones, mortars, and pestles), as well as stone crockery and ornaments.
- Fire mastery: The mastery of fire advanced significantly, enabling the transformation of several materials. The development of lime and plaster allowed for construction applications (e.g., wall insulation, floor plastering) and the production of ceramics, including "white tableware" for domestic use.
- Ceramics: Advances in pyrotechnics led to the production of ceramics, which first appeared in the late Pre-Pottery Neolithic B (PPNB), around 7000 BC. Ceramic vessels—both decorated and undecorated—became common across various regions, including Upper Mesopotamia, western Syria, central Anatolia, and the Zagros. These vessels were primarily developed to meet the needs of the agricultural economy and village life, becoming hallmark features of Late Neolithic societies.
- Basketry: Basketry was used to make containers, mats, and other items. While few physical remains have survived, impressions of these objects have been preserved in the earth, providing evidence of their use.
- Textiles: The development of textile crafts, particularly weaving and spinning, is evidenced by items such as spindle whorls and weights. Linen, wool, and goat's hair were likely used, especially during the Late Neolithic period.
- Construction Techniques: Early Neolithic construction utilized adobe and cob techniques for superstructures. By the Pre-Pottery Neolithic A (PPNA), the use of mud bricks became widespread and continued to evolve, giving rise to regional traditions in construction methods during the Late Neolithic.
- Water Management: Advances in water management included the development of various hydraulic installations, such as wells, cisterns, and water retention dams. Irrigation canals were constructed, particularly in Central Mesopotamia, after 6000 BC, to support the expansion of agriculture in arid regions.

The transformations that occurred during the Neolithic greatly impacted these industries, leading to the production of increasingly diverse products. These changes were primarily driven by the adaptations necessary for the establishment of agro-pastoral economies. While most production took place in domestic settings by non-specialists, over time, more elaborate production processes emerged, suggesting the rise of "specialized" crafts. The result was the emergence of craftsmen who focused almost exclusively on the production of artisanal goods. These artisans' expertise and products were highly sought after, and their work appears to have been widely distributed, potentially through itinerant artisans who shared their knowledge across various regions.

== Visual arts ==
=== Figurines and statuettes ===
The most widespread category of non-utilitarian objects in the Neolithic Near East consists of small representations of animals or humans. These are referred to as figurines when modeled in materials such as clay, plaster, or lime, and as statuettes when carved from stone.

Such small-scale representations were already common during the Natufian period. They often appeared as decorative elements on tools and weapons or as isolated objects made of bone depicting animals—typically ruminants, possibly gazelles—or as human statuettes carved from stone. These human representations generally focused on the head and were rendered either in a stylized or relatively realistic manner.

During the Pre-Pottery Neolithic A (PPNA), female figures became the dominant motif. These were fashioned as limestone statuettes or clay figurines, some of which were intentionally fired. The forms range from schematic types—such as the T-shaped figurines of the Zagros—to more realistic or volumetric depictions. In the southern Levant, however, the figures are generally flatter. Regardless of style, these figurines clearly indicate the gender of the subject. J. Cauvin interpreted them as divine representations, reflecting what he termed a "symbolic revolution". Some examples consist solely of heads. Male representations appear during the Pre-Pottery Neolithic B (PPNB), though they are far less common than female ones. Animal figurines and statuettes also remained prevalent during the Pre-Ceramic Neolithic. In the Levant, bovids were particularly favored. In the Zagros, where animal representations outnumber human ones, depictions of goats and wild boars are common. In Upper Mesopotamia, sites such as Nemrik yielded numerous animal head statuettes, including many birds.

From the end of the PPNB into the Ceramic Neolithic, figurines became more elaborate, incorporating features such as eyes. Yarmoukian figurines, from the southern Levant, typically depict seated or standing figures with flattened profiles. In the Northern Levant and Mesopotamia, standing figurines with a similarly flattened profile are more common. In the Zagros, the stylized T-shaped forms persisted, although seated volumetric figurines were also present in these regions. In Anatolia, more voluptuous female figurines appeared during this period, often interpreted as fertility symbols. One notable example from Çatalhöyük depicts a woman in childbirth.

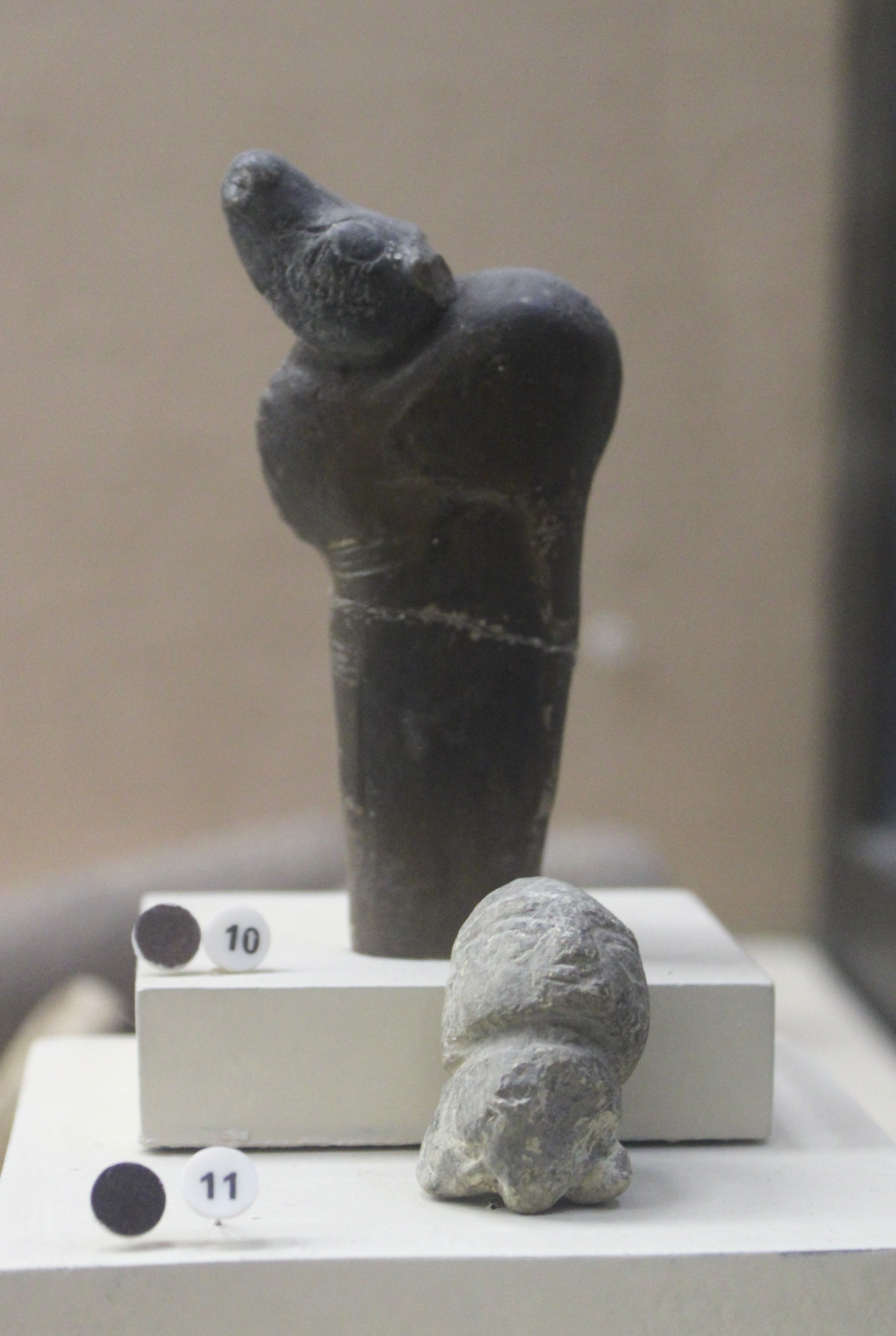
Sculpture casts from El-Wad, Natufian: polished bone sickle handle in the shape of a young deer (?); carved and engraved human head in calcite. Museum of National Archaeology.

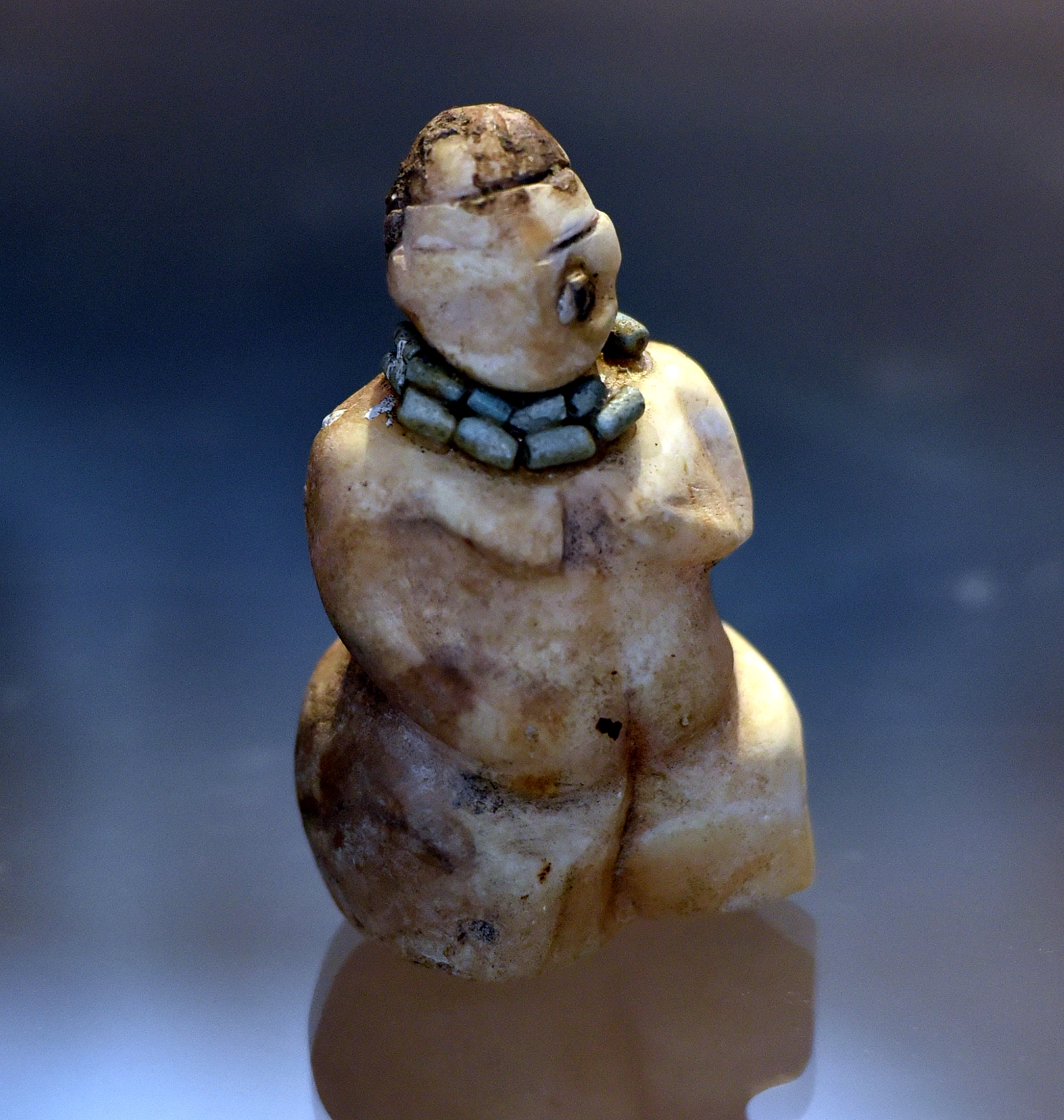
Mother-goddess statuette from Tell es-Sawwan, Samarra period. National Museum of Iraq.

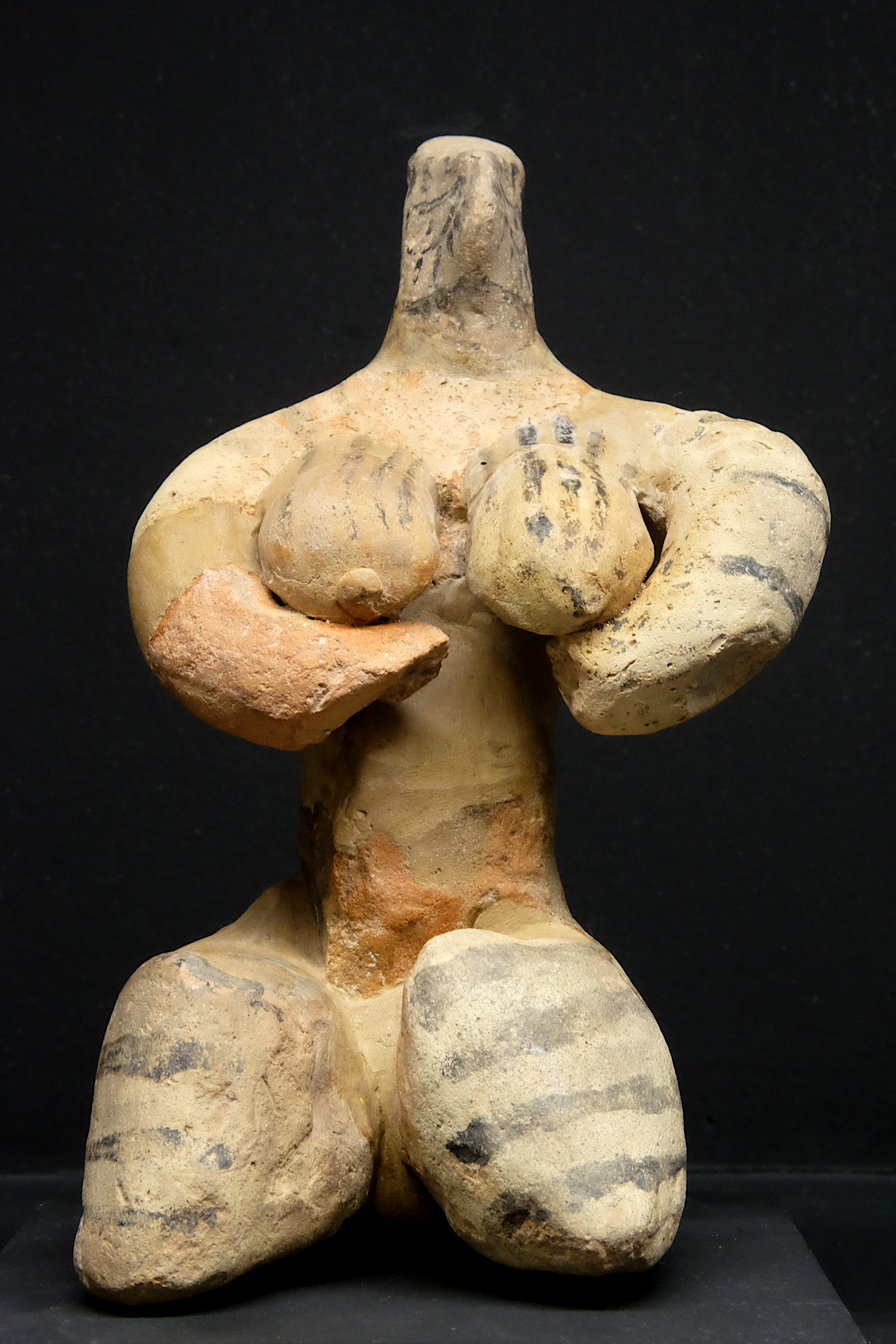
Seated birthing figurine from the Halaf period. Royal Museums of Art and History, Brussels.

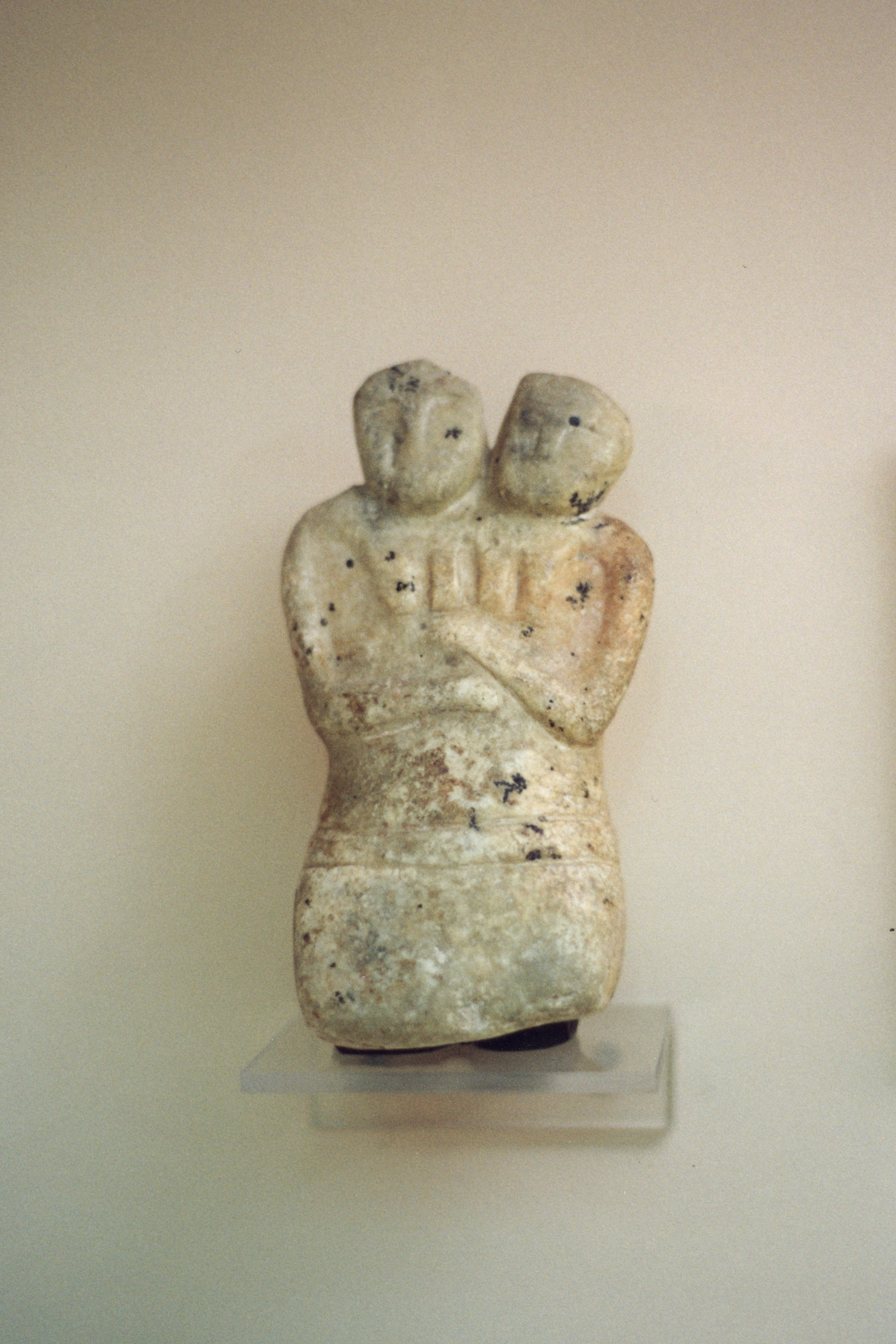
Marble statuette of twin goddesses, Çatal Höyük.

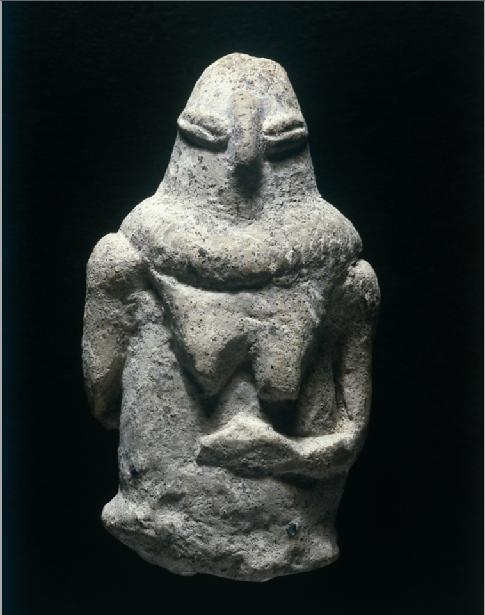
Sha'ar Hagolan human figure. Museum of Yarmukian culture.

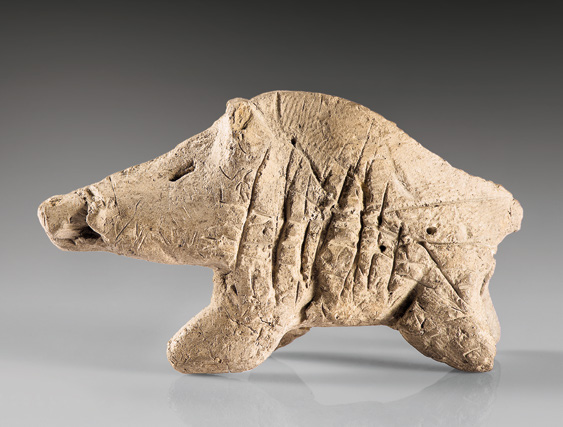
Terracotta boar figurine from Sarab (central Zagros). National Museum of Iran.

=== Statues, pillars and bas-reliefs ===
Statues, which are larger than figurines and statuettes, depict subjects at medium or near life-size scale.

Stone statues first appear in the Pre-Ceramic Neolithic of southeastern Anatolia. Göbekli Tepe is notable for its monumental T-shaped pillars, which are understood to be highly stylized human representations. The central pillars within the enclosures feature bas-reliefs of arms and loincloths, while those around the perimeter display low- or high-relief depictions of animals and, occasionally, humans. The site has also produced a composite "totem" sculpture combining human and animal elements, as well as smaller statues of both. Similar artistic forms are found at Nevalı Çori. A notable example from this period is a 1.80-meter-tall statue of a man discovered in Urfa. More recently, in 2021, bas-reliefs were uncovered at Sayburç, which appear to be contemporary and may indicate the presence of narrative art.

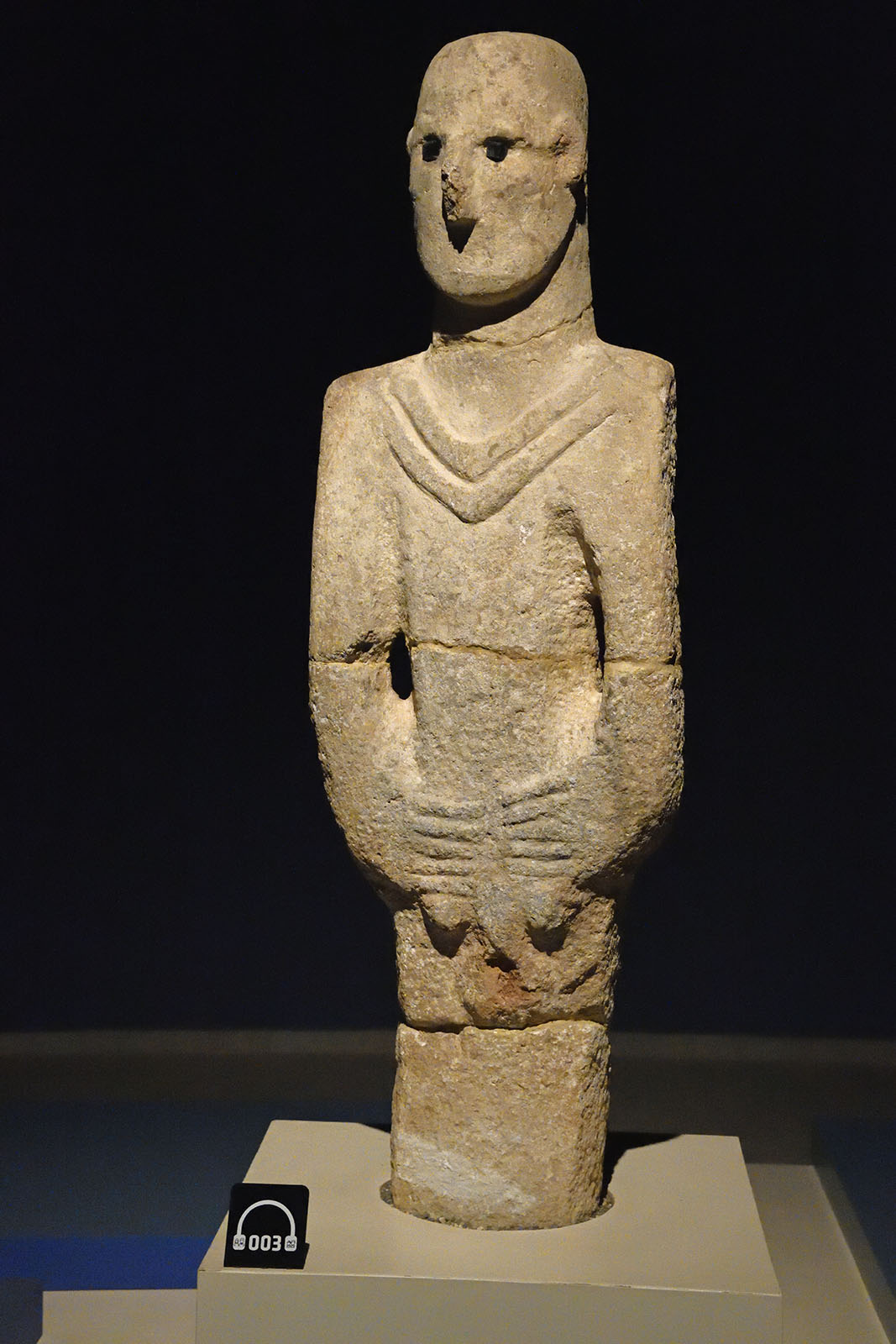
Statue of the "Urfa Man".

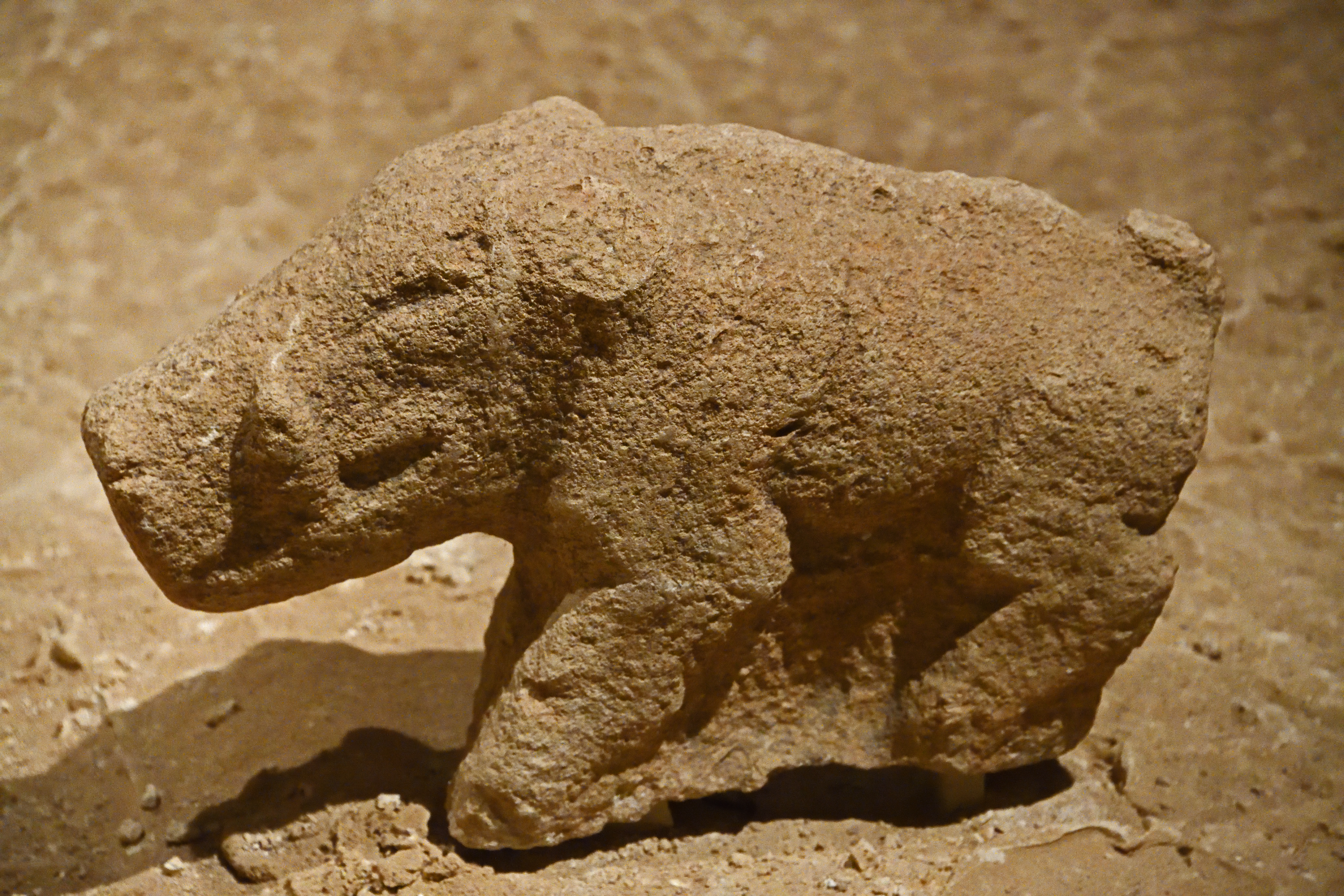
Boar statue, Göbeklitepe.

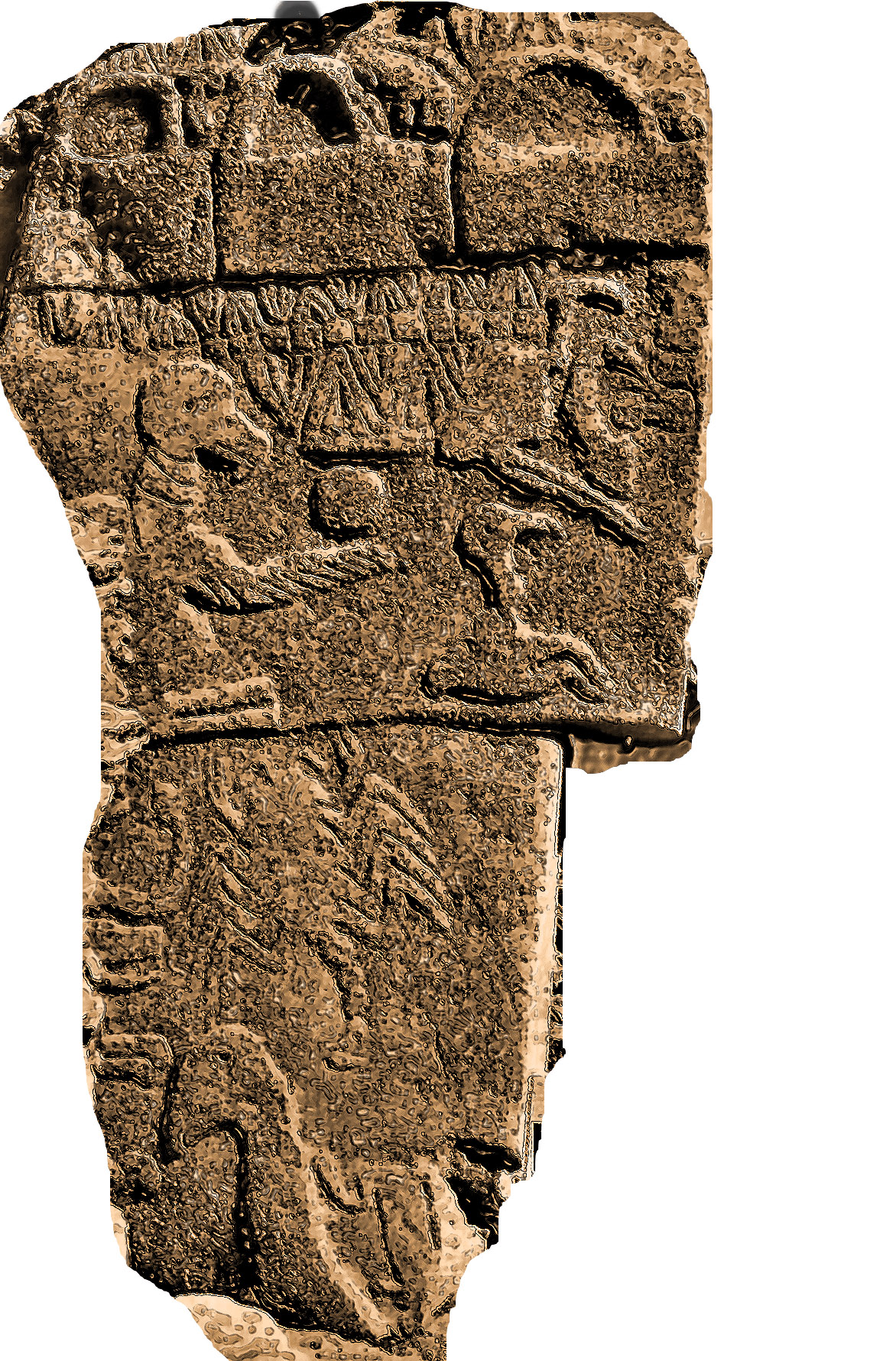
Pillar 43 of Enclosure D at Göbeklitepe.

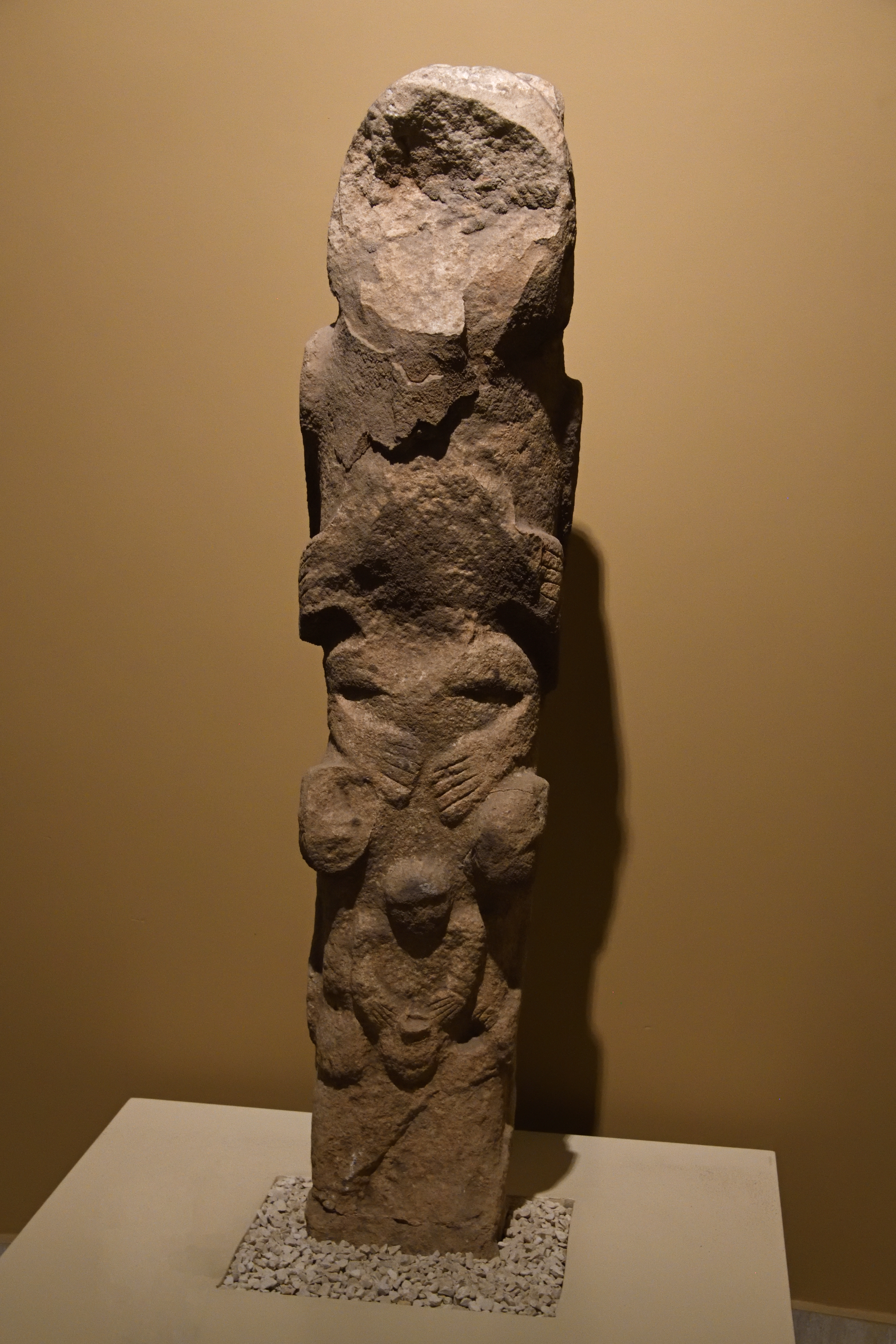
"Totem pole" on level II of Göbeklitepe.

Pre-Pottery Neolithic B (PPNB) statuary is represented by a group of sculptures from Ain Ghazal in Jordan, including busts approximately 50 cm in height and full-length statues up to 1 meter tall. These were recovered from two pits where they had been intentionally buried. The statues were modeled from lime or plaster over a reed framework, with bitumen used to delineate the eyes and pupils, and red slip applied to some of the faces. Fragments of similar statues, including legs, have also been discovered at Jericho. Contemporaneously, in the Southern Levant, plaster and lime modeling was applied to human skulls retrieved from burials. These modeled skulls often featured shell inlays for eyes and were sometimes painted, serving as a kind of postmortem reconstruction. The ritual significance of these practices remains debated. Stone masks from the same period are also associated with statuary and may have held ritual or symbolic functions.

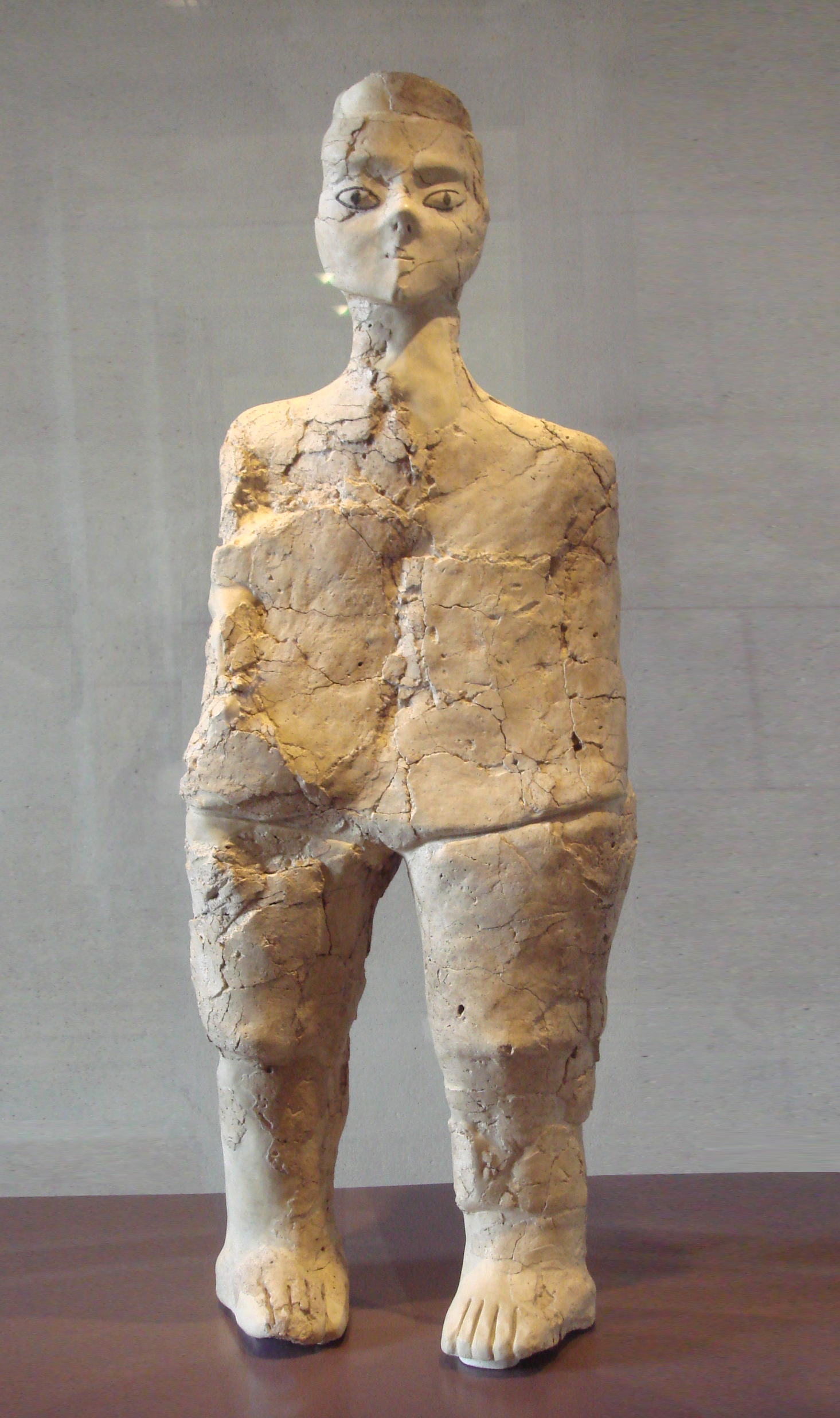
Plaster statue of a human form, Ayn Ghazal. Musée du Louvre.

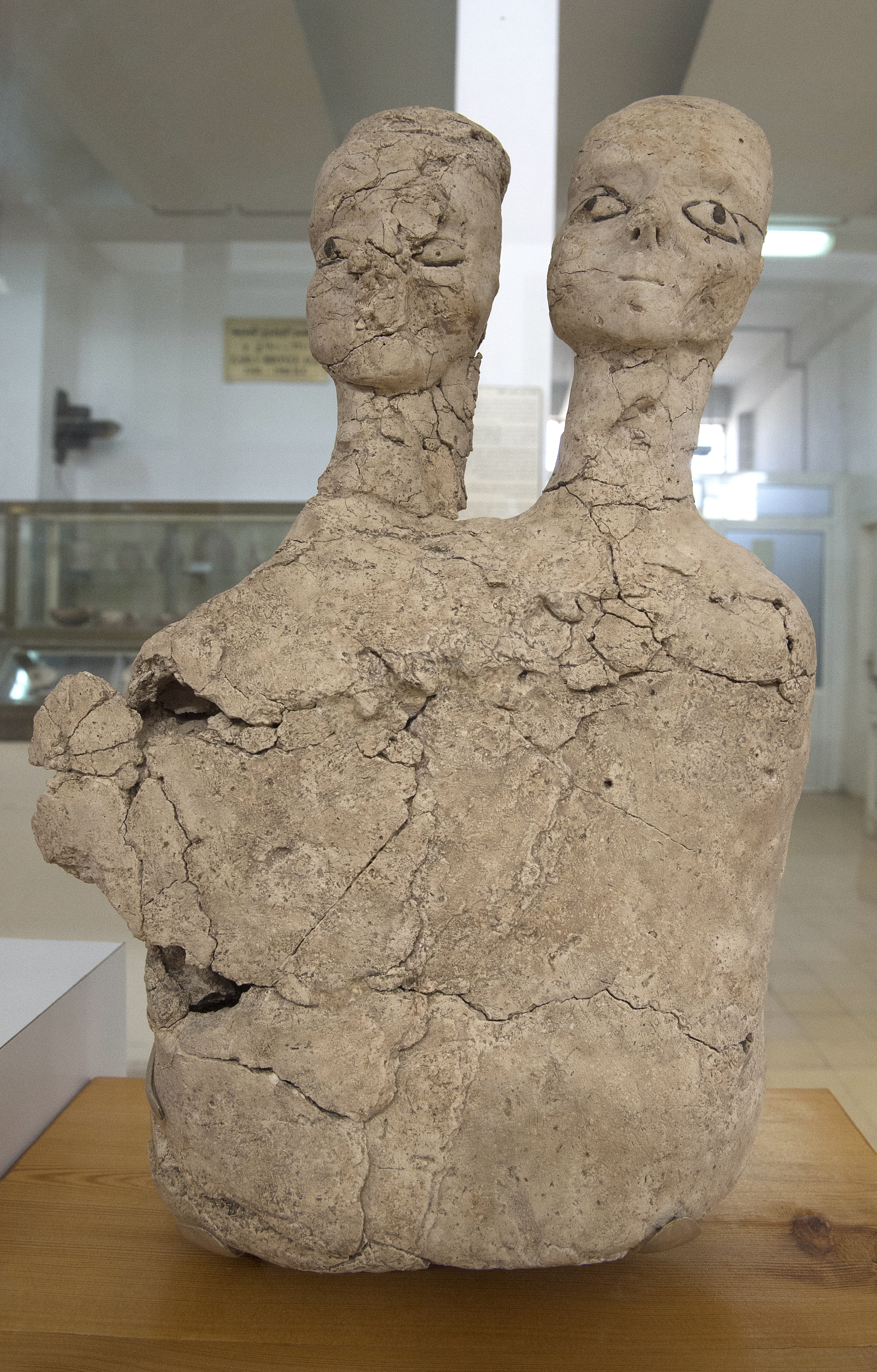
Plaster statues of two humans, Ayn Ghazal. Jordan Archaeological Museum.

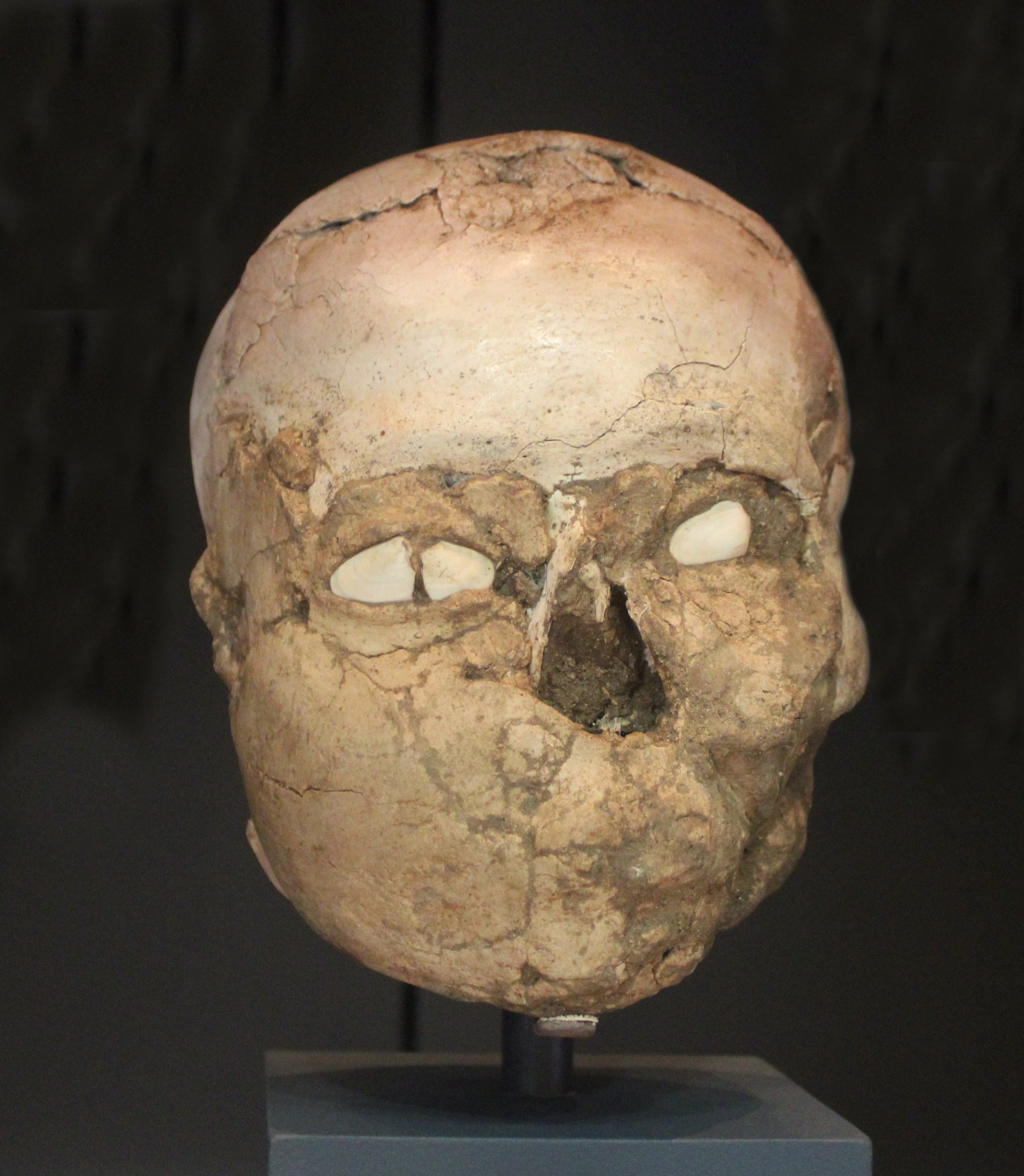
Overmodelled skull from Jericho. British Museum.

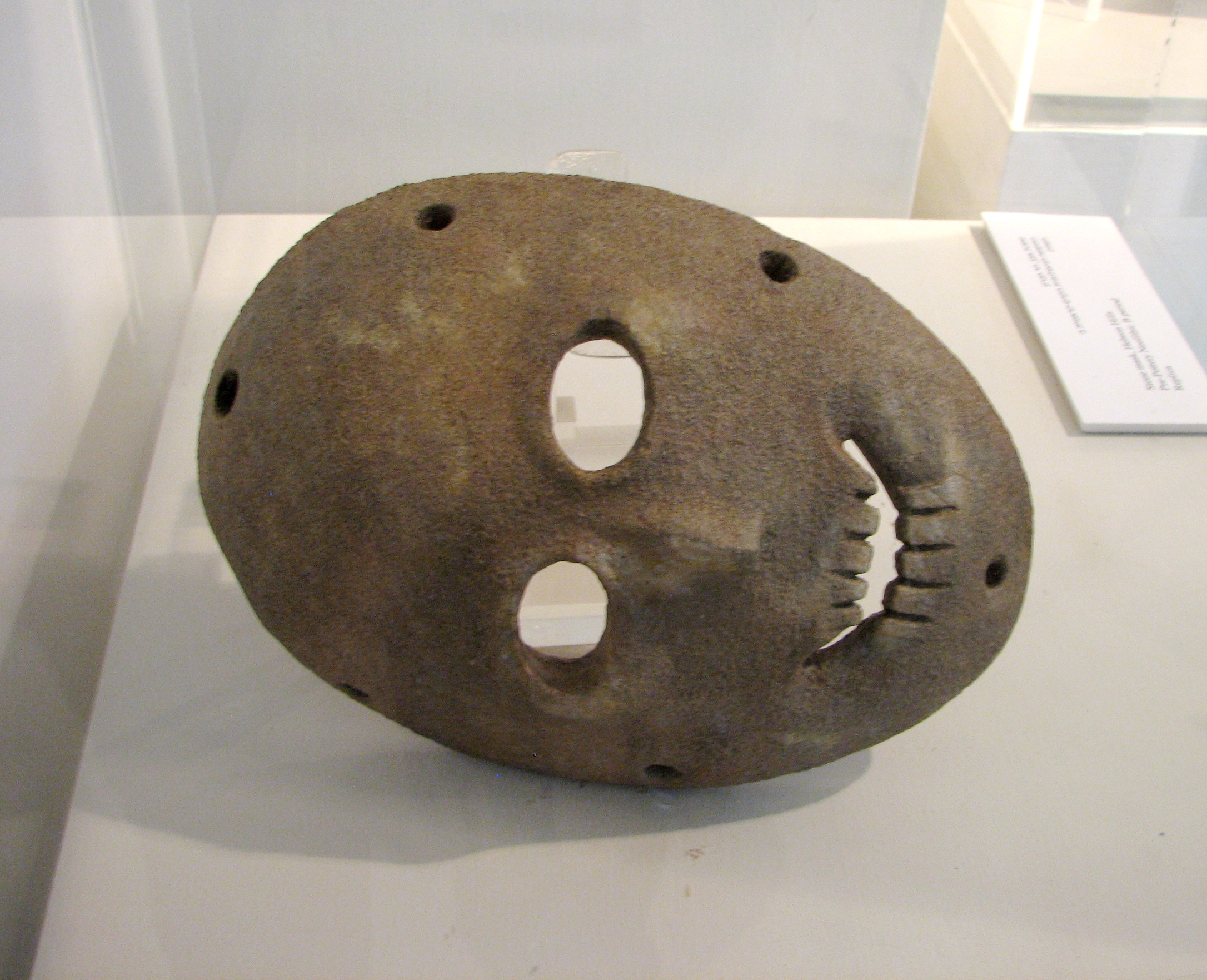
Stone mask unearthed in the Hebron Hills. Moshe Stekelis Museum of Prehistory, Haifa.

=== Mural painting ===
Painted wall and floor decorations first appear toward the end of the Pre-Pottery Neolithic A (PPNA). At Mureybet (c. 9300–9000 BC), geometric motifs such as zigzags and stripes were discovered on the walls of a residential structure, while at Dja'de (c. 9300–8800 BC), a community building was adorned with black and red painted patterns—rectangles and rhombuses—executed in charcoal and red ochre (hematite), set against a white background made of limestone powder. During the Middle Pre-Pottery Neolithic B (PPNB), human figures begin to appear in mural art. At Tell Halula, some twenty red-painted female figures—possibly dancers—are arranged around a square shape on a building floor. Animal depictions follow shortly thereafter, such as the red ostriches found in a fresco at Bouqras (c. 6800 BC), and similar motifs at Umm Dabaghiyah. The most elaborate Neolithic wall paintings in the Near East are found at the site of Çatal Höyük (c. 7000–6500 BC), in Central Anatolia. Here, mural compositions in domestic spaces depict complex scenes combining humans and animals—bulls, deer, and other figures—often interpreted as hunting scenes or ritual dances.

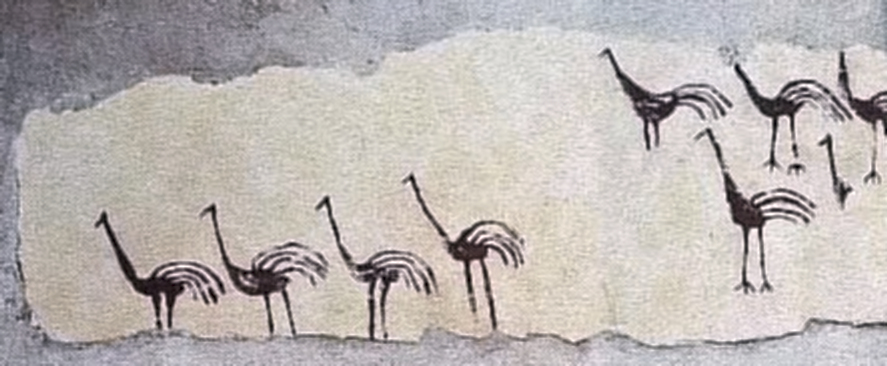
Fragment of a Bouqras mural in the Deir ez-Zor Museum.

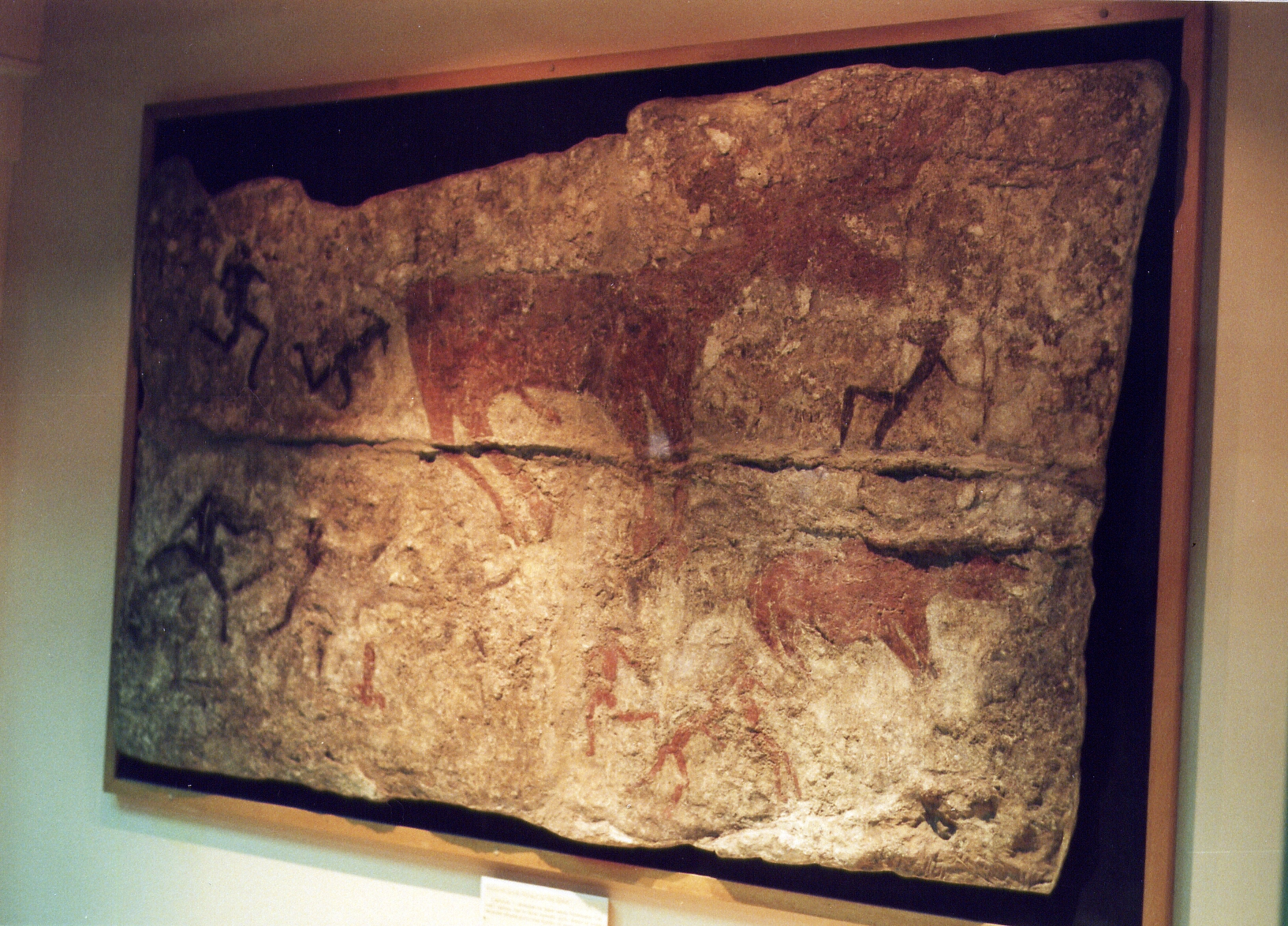
Fragment of a mural from Çatal Höyük. Museum of Anatolian Civilizations, Ankara.

== Religion and rituals ==
The social and economic transformations of the Neolithic period are often associated with significant cognitive and symbolic developments, reflecting a broader shift in worldview. These mental and cultural changes are regarded both as causes and consequences of the broader Neolithic transition. Archaeological excavations have uncovered areas believed to be used for ritual purposes, although the precise nature and meaning of these practices remain largely speculative. While ethnographic parallels are sometimes invoked to support interpretations, the unfolding of ritual actions and their significance often eludes definitive explanation. Funerary and ritual practices are more accessible to analysis, while underlying belief systems remain difficult to reconstruct. Artistic expressions, frequently interpreted as mythological in nature, are often considered evidence of ritual activity.

The terminology used to describe these aspects of Neolithic life—such as religion, ritual, symbolism, and magic—is complex and often ambiguous. These concepts do not fully overlap: a ritual act may not necessarily be religious, and symbolic meaning can be embedded in everyday objects and actions. Such classifications also imply opposites—profane, pragmatic, or utilitarian spheres—which are often hard to distinguish archaeologically. The boundaries between these domains may not have been meaningful or distinct for Neolithic societies themselves.

=== Treatment of the dead ===
Funerary practices in the Neolithic Near East were diverse and reveal the significant role of death-related rituals and beliefs within the cultural and religious frameworks of early farming societies. However, the number of burials uncovered at archaeological sites is typically low relative to the duration and extent of site occupation, suggesting that only a selection of individuals received formal burial. The criteria for this selection remain unclear, and as a result, the funerary treatment of the majority of the population is not well understood.

One key distinction in burial practice is location. During the Pre-Ceramic Neolithic, interments often occurred beneath inhabited structures, reflecting the growing symbolic importance of domestic space. With the emergence of more structured settlements, dedicated cemeteries began to appear on site peripheries. Some burial sites, such as Kfar HaHoresh, were entirely separate from residential areas and appear to have been reserved for ritual use. Cremation, though rare, is attested in the Final PPNB/PPNC at Baysamun, where one individual's body was cremated shortly after death—unlike other cases of charred remains resulting from secondary treatments performed long after death.

Most Neolithic burials were individual, though collective graves were also common. The deceased were typically buried in a flexed position, with varying orientations. Grave goods were rare and generally limited to personal ornaments, indicating little overt display of status in most cases. Exceptions exist, such as a child's grave at Ba'ja (Jordan), accompanied by an elaborate ornament consisting of hundreds of beads, suggesting differentiation in burial treatment.

Secondary burial practices are a hallmark of the period. These involved the exhumation of bodies, followed by reburial, often beneath buildings. In many cases, skulls were removed, modified, and either buried separately or displayed in specific locations, including so-called "houses of the dead," such as those at Çayönü and Dja'de.[2][3] These practices are commonly interpreted as evidence of ancestor veneration or foundation rituals, indicating the symbolic or social significance of certain individuals within the community.

=== Ritual places ===
The identification of ritual or religious practices in the Neolithic Near East often hinges on locating structures interpreted as sanctuaries or ritual buildings. These are generally defined as distinct from domestic dwellings based on architectural features (such as specialized layouts or construction techniques) or contents (including non-utilitarian objects like statues or skull deposits). The recognition of such structures came relatively late in Near Eastern archaeology, and their very existence was once questioned. Terminology varies among scholars. Some prefer the more inclusive term ritual buildings, which may have hosted a range of ceremonies with sacred or collective significance—such as burials, rites of passage, or matrimonial exchanges. Ethnographic parallels have also led to the identification of "men's houses" or "clan houses" used for community rituals, particularly initiation ceremonies. In certain cases, entire sites appear to have held supra-local ritual significance, serving multiple communities. Göbekli Tepe and Kfar HaHoresh, for example, are sometimes described as amphictyonies—ritual centers shared by regional groups.

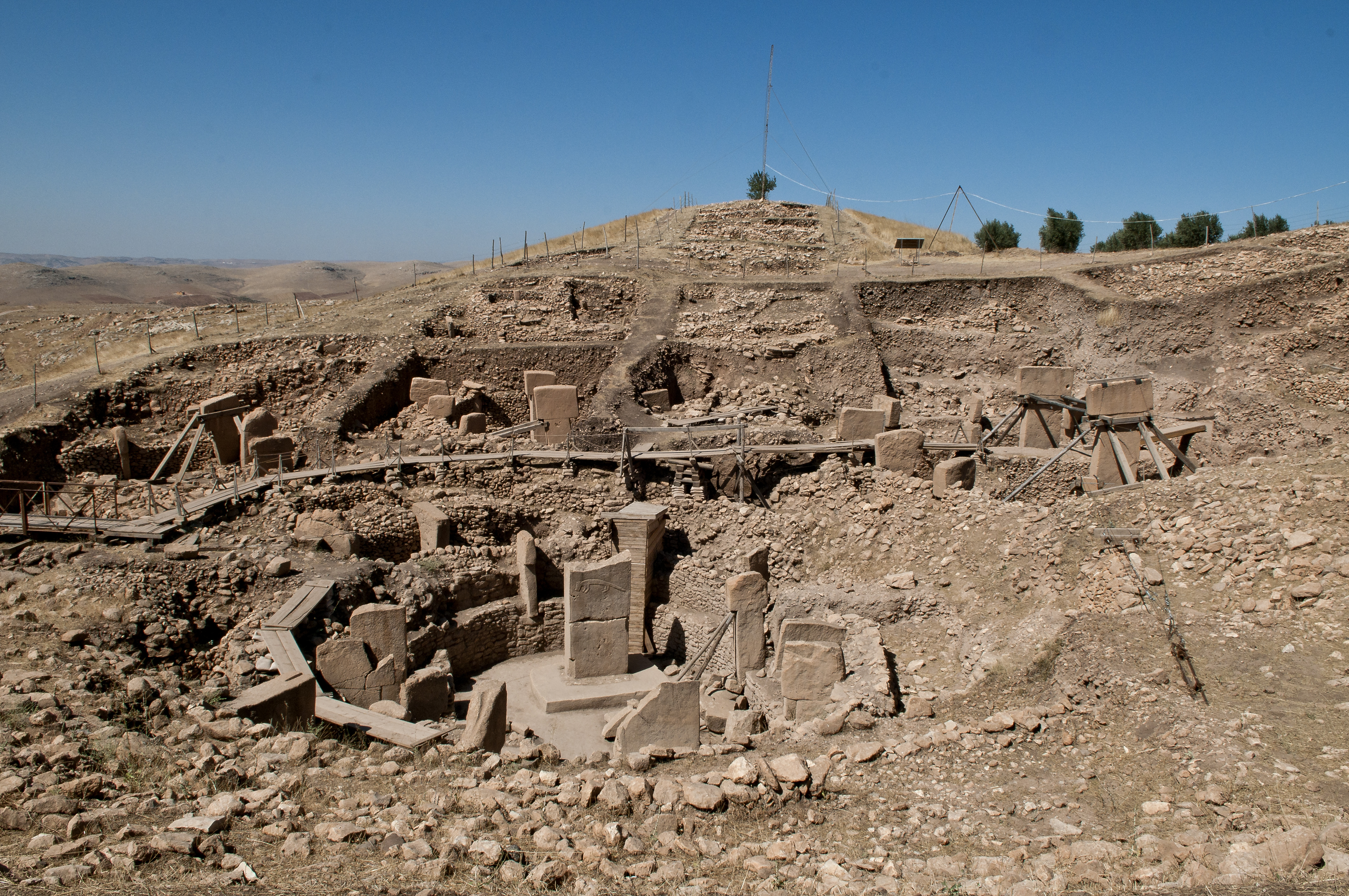
Göbekli Tepe.

In any case, the assemblages indicating the performance of rituals, whether public or not, are thus found in locations of various types: Göbekli Tepe and the other sanctuaries at southeast Anatolian sites that have yielded vases, statues and human skulls; the circular construction with a deposit of wild goat skulls and raptor wings at Zawi Chemi Shanidar; the Nahal Hemar Cave and its deposit of ritual objects; the "special buildings" at Ain Ghazal and the cache of anthropomorphic statues at the same site; and so on. The increasing archaeological visibility of ritual practices during the Neolithic reflects their central role in structuring social life. Such practices are thought to have played a cohesive role within expanding village communities, reinforcing collective identities and, in some cases, legitimizing emerging social hierarchies. Some scholars question strict distinctions between domestic and sacred space, particularly in light of theories proposing that Neolithic societies functioned as "house societies," where the household carried deep symbolic meaning and possibly ritual significance.

In the Middle Euphrates region, a number of "community buildings" have been excavated at sites such as Jerf el Ahmar, Mureybet, and Tell 'Abr 3. These structures often feature bucrania (ox skulls), benches, and sculpted bas-reliefs, implying a ritual or ceremonial role. The presence of such elements suggests cultural links with neighboring Anatolian sites like Göbekli Tepe and Çayönü.

In the southern Levant, structure O75 at Wadi Faynan 16 (Jordan) is a semi-subterranean building with benches, where finds of animal bones, stone figurines, and broken ceramics suggest a space used for communal gatherings, which may have included ritual activities.

During the PPNB, evidence for ritual activity becomes more widespread. The Nahal Hemar cave in the Judean Desert yielded a rich assemblage of ritual artifacts, including stone masks, wooden figurines, over-modelled skulls, and intricately made beads and vessels. The site of Kfar HaHoresh, interpreted as a necropolis, features plastered tombs enclosed in rectangular compounds, hearths, and monolith-bordered enclosures. These architectural features point to use for multi-community ceremonial gatherings. A similar enclosure with monoliths was identified at the submerged site of Atlit Yam, off the coast of modern Israel.

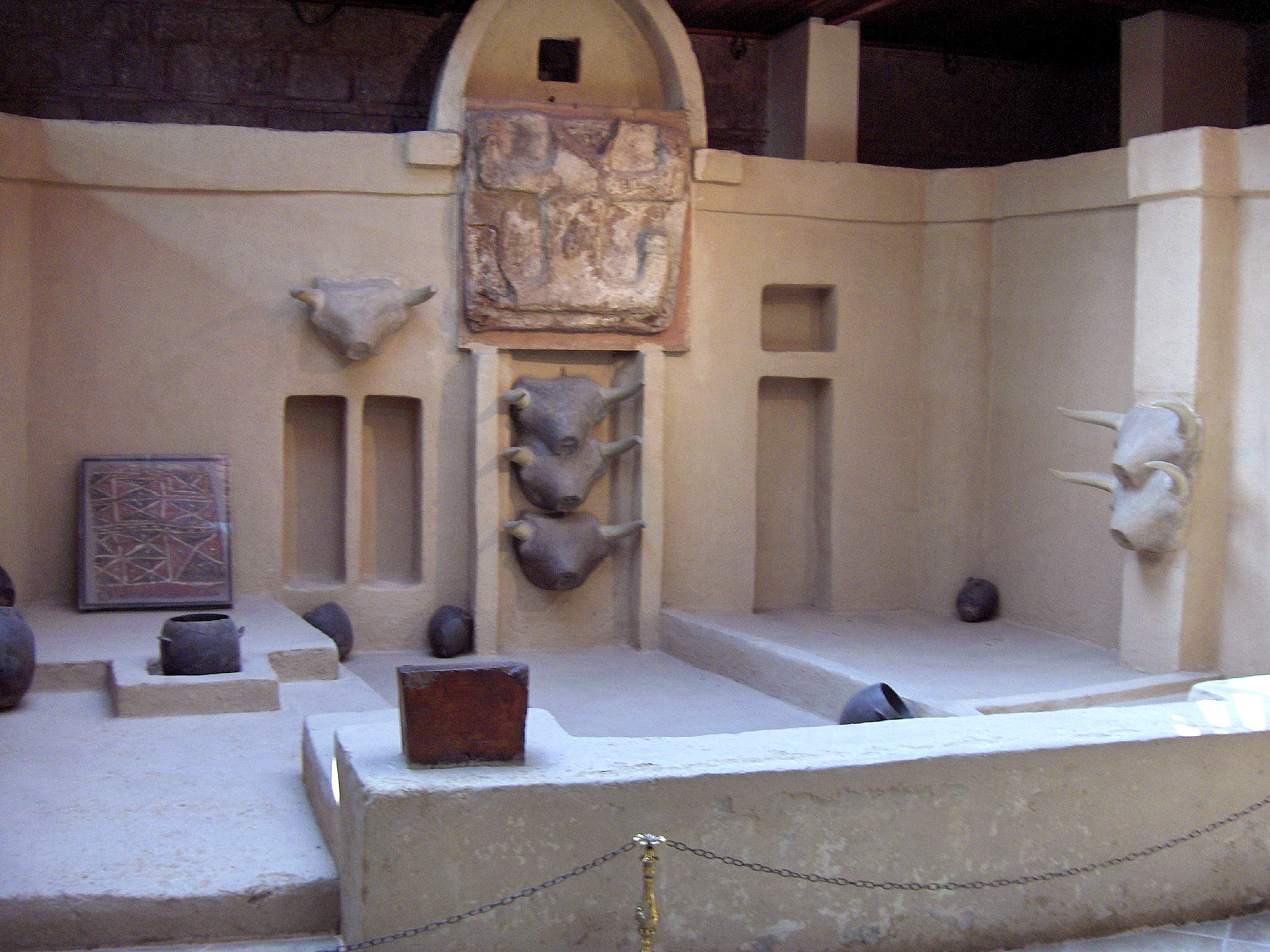
Reconstruction of the Level VI "sanctuary" at Çatal Höyük. Museum of Anatolian Civilization, Ankara.

In the Late Neolithic, the Çatal Höyük site in Central Anatolia includes several buildings initially described by J. Mellaart as sanctuaries, due to their rich symbolic decoration (e.g., bucrania, plaster reliefs, and murals depicting animals and scenes). However, later analysis by Ian Hodder and colleagues reevaluated these spaces as "History Houses"—residences that served as focal points of household identity and memory over generations, rather than strictly religious spaces. These buildings often underwent multiple reconstructions on the same foundations, suggesting long-term familial or communal continuity rather than differentiation based solely on ritual function.

=== The "skull cult" ===
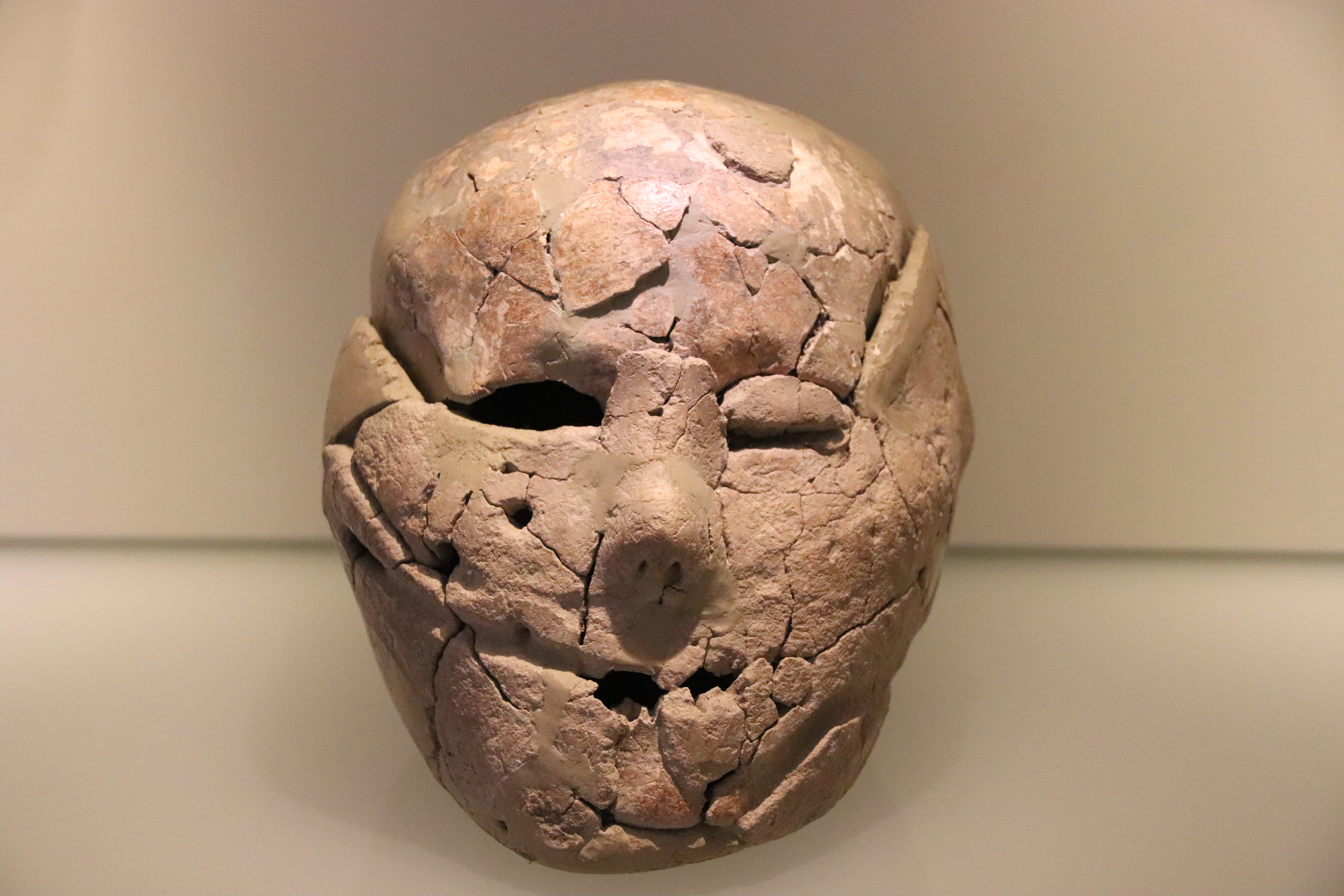
Overmodelled skull from Baysamun. Israel Museum.

One of the main sources for identifying cult practices in the Pre-Ceramic Neolithic is the presence of human skulls found outside primary burials, and more broadly, the circulation and manipulation of human remains for purposes that appear ritual in nature, particularly in the context of secondary burials. These practices, which exhibit wide regional and chronological variation, are attested from at least the Natufian period onward and are found across the Levant, southeastern Anatolia, and northern Mesopotamia. The individuals involved include men and women, as well as adults and children. Skulls were removed from bodies, often showing signs of desiccation, and a minority were subject to further treatment, such as overmodeling, particularly in the Southern Levant. In most cases, it remains unclear whether the individuals died of natural causes or were deliberately killed. Archaeological evidence, such as headless skeletons found beneath houses, suggests that skull removal and secondary burial were deliberate practices. These skulls may have been reburied elsewhere—under residences—or placed on display in buildings, as seen at sites such as Çayönü, Djade, and Tell Aswad. In some instances, human remains are found in association with animal remains. These practices, often described as "skull cults," are generally interpreted as a form of ancestor worship, involving memorial rituals linked to a village community or family group. However, alternative interpretations, such as the collection of war trophies, have also been proposed.

=== Neolithic celebrations ===
Religious festivals—occasional or perhaps periodic public rituals—represent another important aspect of Neolithic ritual life. These celebrations have been described as formal events organized by a member of the community who assumed responsibility for their preparation, including the provision of supplies. While resembling informal communal gatherings, they were structured occasions involving collective participation (A. Testart). Such events may have served funerary, foundational, or initiatory purposes, and frequently appear to relate to themes of death and ancestral cults. Fertility rites, by contrast, are thought to have been rare during the Neolithic period. These public ceremonies combined ritual acts, belief systems, funerary customs, and the construction of shared memory. They also played a role in social structures, supporting mechanisms of competition, cohesion, and negotiation within growing communities.

Drawing on both archaeological evidence and ethnographic comparisons, scholars have identified several indicators of large-scale feasts (as smaller ones are less archaeologically visible). These included communal food and drink consumption, evidenced by the presence of containers, animal bones, and plant remains. Göbekli Tepe is a notable example, where archaeological finds suggest gatherings of multiple communities. Large quantities of animal remains and grinding tools have been discovered, indicating the preparation of substantial feasts involving the milling of cereals and the slaughter of gazelles and other game animals.

Sacrificial practices also formed part of these events. At Kfar HaHoresh (PPNB), the so-called "Bos Pit" contained the remains of eight cattle, apparently sacrificed as part of a funerary rite. The "Death Pit" at Domuztepe (Late Halaf period) yielded around ten thousand highly fragmented bones—mainly animal, but also human (around forty individuals)—as well as pottery shards and various objects, all in a context interpreted by excavators as ritual. Some human remains were hypothesized to be evidence of cannibalism.

Stone masks found at sites in both the southern and northern Levant, including Nahal Hemar and Göbekli Tepe, may have been used in public performances. While their weight suggests they may not have been worn, it is possible that lighter, perishable versions also existed. Figurative representations in bas-reliefs and ceramic paintings led Y. Garfinkel to propose that communal dances were significant in Neolithic societies.

=== Beliefs ===
The analysis of Neolithic imagery has led some scholars to move beyond interpretations focused solely on communal, memorial, or ancestral rites, in an effort to explore underlying belief systems and symbolic frameworks.

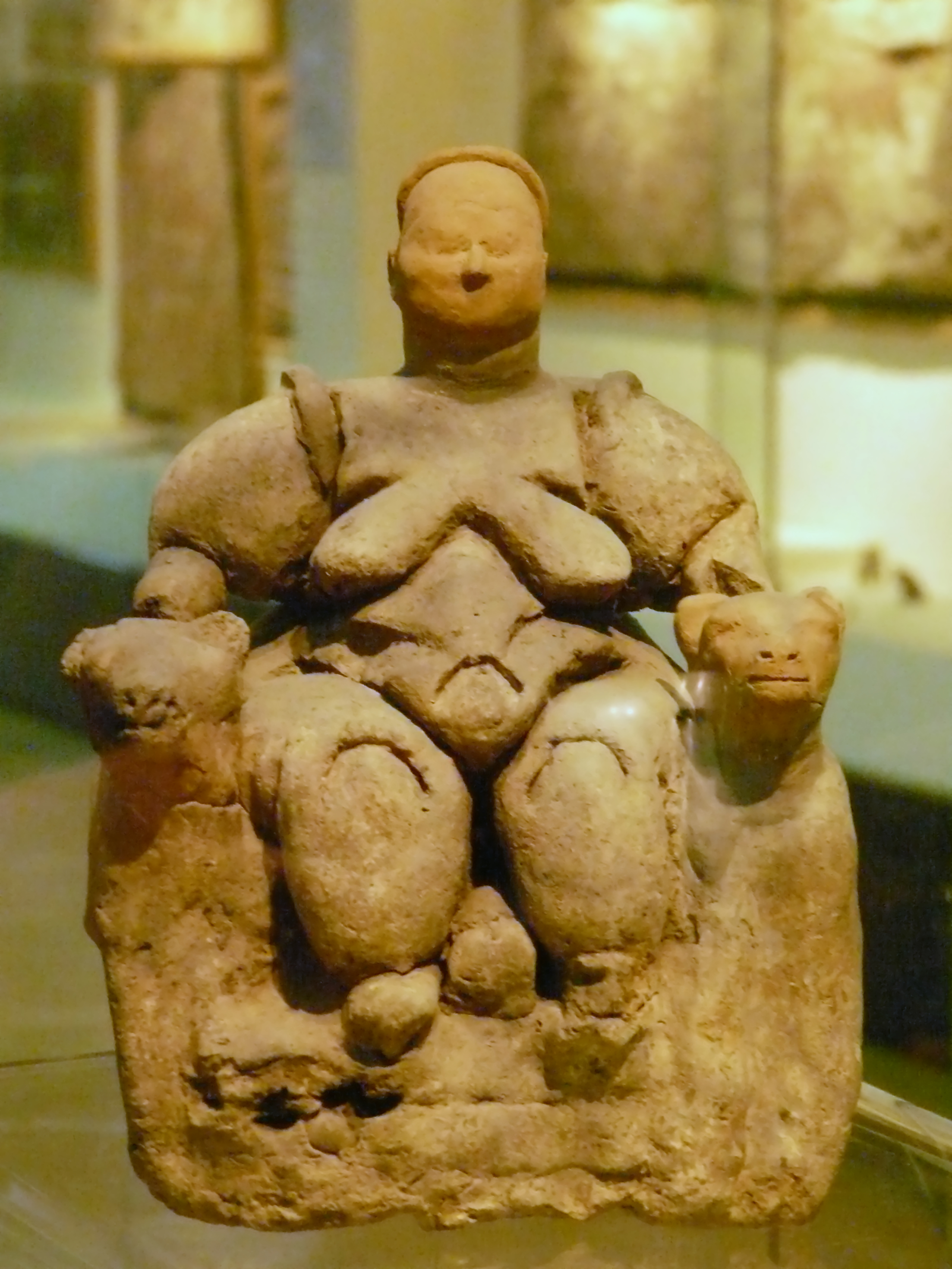
Çatal Höyük's "mother goddess" with her wild beasts.

J. Mellaart proposed that the female figures found at Çatal Höyük represent "mother-goddesses" associated with fertility cults. Expanding on this, J. Cauvin suggested that the Neolithic Near East witnessed the emergence of divinities, with the Goddess—represented primarily by terracotta figurines—playing a central role as both a fertility figure and a sovereign entity. He also posited the existence of a male counterpart, the Bull, though not yet anthropomorphized. These ideas draw on parallels with later historical Near Eastern religions, which included both male and female deities. According to Cauvin, the introduction of these divine figures reflects a broader transformation in human thought—a symbolic "revolution" characterized by a perceived divide between divine forces and everyday humanity. This ideological shift is symbolized, for instance, by the raised-arm postures of orant figures depicted in Neolithic and ancient art. However, the commonly asserted link between female figurines and fertility remains debated, as it is not consistently supported by contextual evidence. Interpretations of Neolithic mythologies—or rather, regional mythological systems—are likely more complex and variable than previously suggested.

Some researchers have also hypothesized the presence of shamanic practices and animistic beliefs in Neolithic communities. Animal representations, which are abundant in the Pre-Ceramic Neolithic of southeastern Anatolia and the Middle Euphrates, are sometimes depicted in association with human figures. In some cases, humans appear to be wearing animal disguises, which may reflect beliefs in the capacity for mystical transformation or spiritual journeys in animal form.

== Social evolution ==
The formation of Neolithic village societies involved the reorganization of social structures at the levels of the family, household, and broader communities, as well as the establishment of relationships with external groups. These transformations are difficult to discern solely from archaeological evidence. However, the general picture that emerges is one of groups composed of several nuclear families, maintaining cohesion and coexistence through various practical or symbolic means. Elements of social distinction, such as differences in wealth or gender, appear to have been limited, and instances of violence were not widespread.

=== Health and living conditions ===
The adoption of the Neolithic lifestyle is generally associated with a decline in human health and stature, a trend observed in various regions through bioarchaeological studies. This deterioration is attributed to increased exposure to stress, a less diverse and lower-quality diet, the rise of infectious diseases resulting from population density and close contact with domestic animals and rodents, and the heightened risk of food shortages due to failed harvests. These findings partially support earlier theories, such as those proposed by Marshall Sahlins, which argue that the hunter-gatherer economy represented an "age of abundance," while the Neolithic farming and herding economy may not have offered nutritional advantages.

Bioarchaeological studies focus mainly on skeletons from the southern Levant, the region that has provided by far the most documentation. There are also significant samples from the pre-ceramic phases at Abu Hureyra, Körtik Tepe, and Nemrik. It should be borne in mind that the entire population was clearly not buried, even where the greatest number of burials have been identified, which raises questions about the representativeness of the sample. These studies tend to provide a contrasting view of developments: new sanitary conditions are indeed being put in place, but the picture is not systematically negative. From the Final Natoufian onwards and during the PPNA, populations appear to have experienced a decline in health, with a reduction in stature, particularly among women, attributed to nutritional deficiencies during childhood. A reduction in the size of teeth, worn down by increased cereal consumption and also by their use as a "third hand" in artisanal work (notably fiber weaving), is commonly observed with Neolithization. There was also an increase in caries and enamel insufficiency (hypoplasia). In addition, analyses of bone-wearing movements suggest that work became more physically demanding than in the past, linked to the development of heavy load-bearing (on the back; this concerns adults as well as teenagers) and repetitive grinding movements in a prolonged squatting position (more so for women), generating muscular stress. This would coincide with the introduction of agriculture, and perhaps also with population growth leading to a reduction in per capita resources. Inflammatory diseases also appear to have been less common among mobile hunter-gatherers. By contrast, from the middle PPNB onwards, the situation seems to have improved, no doubt due to the stabilization of the agro-pastoral system: with agriculture under control and the transition to animal husbandry completed (with the introduction of milk in particular), people were better nourished and more resilient. Average height increased and hypoplasia became less marked, but tooth wear remained high, cavities became more common, and tooth loss more frequent. In the long term, there is no significant difference between the Natoufian and Neolithic periods in terms of trauma and pathologies such as arthritis. The Neolithic lifestyle introduced differences between the sexes: men from Natoufian hunter-gatherer groups seem to have died younger than women, due to risks associated with hunting, since this activity was reserved for them; on the other hand, Neolithic men seem to have lived longer because this risk disappeared, while women's life expectancy seems to have decreased due to greater fertility, which increased the risks associated with pregnancy and childbirth. One analysis puts life expectancy at 24.6 years in the Natoufian and 25.5 years in the Neolithic; the average age of death is 31.2 and 32.1 years respectively. Stress indices, on the other hand, seem to be more pronounced in the Final PPNB/PPNC, a period of difficult subsistence and infectious diseases.

It is generally believed that the domestication of animals and the resulting proximity between humans and animals led to the emergence of zoonoses, diseases transmitted from animals to humans and vice versa. However, potential evidence of this phenomenon is very limited. A few skeletons from sites in the northern Levant (Dja'de, Tell Aswad), the earliest dated to around 8500 BC, provide the earliest known evidence of tuberculosis in humans. Tuberculosis is a disease of bovine origin, and this is the period during which the domestication of this animal is supposed to have begun or to be in progress. The coincidence is therefore striking, but the possibility of an earlier presence of this disease in humans cannot be ruled out.

The Late Neolithic populations of the Levant bear witness to the continuing adjustment to the Neolithic way of life: average life expectancy is around 30, deaths are more numerous between the ages of 30 and 50, and more women are over 40.

=== Population growth ===
Population growth occurred during the Neolithic process, with consequences for social and economic development when demographic thresholds were crossed. However, there is disagreement regarding the starting point: as early as the Natoufian period, during the Pre-Pottery Neolithic A (PPNA), or during the Pre-Pottery Neolithic B (PPNB). In general, it is believed, based on ethnographic observations, that a sedentary lifestyle is potentially conducive to increased fertility. Compared to a mobile lifestyle, the risk of miscarriage is lower in sedentary populations, and the duration of breastfeeding is shorter, which in turn reduces the interval between conceptions duration of breast-feeding is shorter, which in turn reduces the interval between conceptions. More significantly, the adoption of agriculture and animal husbandry enabled a larger population to subsist on a constant land surface, thereby increasing the carrying capacity of local environments and leading to a more pronounced demographic increase among Neolithic populations than among foragers.

The "Neolithic demographic transition" model, now referred to as the "agricultural demographic transition" (J.-P. Bocquet-Appel), proposes that population growth followed the adoption of a sedentary agricultural lifestyle, due to the additional caloric intake it provided. This, combined with a reduction in female energy expenditure resulting from the end of a mobile lifestyle, would have led to increased fertility while mortality remained constant, at least initially. In a second phase, mortality—particularly that of children—increased due to higher housing density, which created less healthy conditions conducive to the spread of disease, and also led to earlier weaning. Eventually, this stabilized as population density decreased. In this model, population growth is both a cause and a consequence of the initial systemic change brought about by the emergence of agriculture.

Without questioning the idea of population growth, evidence for higher settlement density remains largely confined to the southern Levant, particularly during the PPNA, when the concentration of sites is relatively high. This pattern is not observed in the northern Levant, where settlements are more widely spaced, either at the beginning of the domestication process in this region or after the adoption of the agro-pastoral economy. The carrying capacity of village territories does not appear to have reached its limit, except in a few cases.

=== Groups and social solidarity ===
Organizational methods may have varied significantly across regions and periods, but they appear to have relied little on coercion or alienation. Group composition seems to have remained fluid throughout the Neolithic period.

The size of residences is generally assumed to reflect the size of the families that occupied them, or more accurately, "households" considered as social and economic units. However, interpreting this data is not straightforward. For the Natoufian period, it is plausible that small groups based on nuclear families persisted, particularly in more mobile contexts, while more sedentary sites may have supported extended families. Residences from the PPNA appear more likely to have been designed for nuclear families, and it is also possible that villages—or parts of them—grouped families with kinship ties. A shift toward larger constructions with functionally differentiated spaces is evident in the late PPNB and during the Ceramic Neolithic in the southern Levant, notably at Sha'ar HaGolan, where walled building complexes suggest the presence of extended families.[4] In contrast, in Central Anatolia, settlements tend to reflect occupation by nuclear families. Here, residences are often continuously inhabited by the same family, supporting the concept of a "house society" as defined by Claude Lévi-Strauss, where the house serves as a focal point of family organization and heritage. This may explain the symbolic expressions found in such houses, including paintings and ritual furniture.

transition to a sedentary lifestyle, followed by the adoption of an agro-pastoral economy, led to the development of larger villages and communities composed of multiple households. These households coexisted and established forms of collective organization, at least for economic purposes, to mitigate the risks inherent in agriculture. Archaeological evidence points to the early appearance of community buildings, beginning at least in the PPNA. Examples include the "tower" at Jericho, the communal buildings at Jerf el Ahmar, and the monumental structures at Göbekli Tepe—buildings with apparent public functions, distinct from private spaces. These suggest broader interactions within and between communities. Some community buildings may have served as meeting places, while certain sanctuaries appear to have held significance beyond a single community, possibly constructed by an "amphictyony," or a grouping of communities with shared ritual purposes. These developments reflect efforts to maintain group cohesion in the face of increasing interaction, which introduced potential internal tensions—such as the emergence of more distinct social hierarchies—and external pressures, including inter-community rivalries.

Although Neolithic communities are often considered egalitarian and non-violent, even in later phases, several researchers attribute this to the role of ritual and broader social mechanisms in preserving group cohesion and restraining the rise of individual authority. I. Kuijt has argued that the limited evidence of inequality in burial contexts may reflect the spread of an egalitarian ideology. Collective rituals, such as festivals and the "cult of skulls," are interpreted as efforts to obscure social distinctions and emphasize community solidarity, for example, through a public (village-level) rather than private (family-level) ancestor cult. The mobility of groups and their tendency to fragment may also have helped limit the consolidation of central authority and contributed to the maintenance of an egalitarian social structure. The development of exchange networks for circulating goods appears to have played a role in regulating relationships between communities.

Trends in the Ceramic Neolithic suggest that community organization and social interaction entered a new phase. This is reflected in the emergence of collective storage facilities, sealing practices indicating increased control over the distribution of goods, more extensive inter-community exchange, and the appearance of clearer "regional styles" in material culture. However, these styles should not necessarily be interpreted as evidence of ethnic groups or clans.

=== Inequalities in wealth and power ===
Interpretations of inequality in Neolithic societies, based on archaeological data, often involve subjective considerations. The same type of society—such as the "chieftaincy" exemplified by the ethnographic case of the "Big Men" of Papua—may be viewed as egalitarian by some and inegalitarian by others. These interpretations frequently rely on ethnographic comparisons with societies considered analogous to those of the Neolithic. A central issue is that clear archaeological evidence for inequality in Neolithic contexts is limited. According to A. Testart, who adopts a more inegalitarian reading than most, such societies—if ethnological comparisons are valid—did not support long-term accumulation of wealth, since it was primarily perishable, especially food. Prestige would have been expressed more through the ability to provide than through permanent possession. Even where prestige objects are present, they are not necessarily impressive, and the dwellings of elite individuals are generally similar in size to others. Overall, such societies would not exhibit extremes of wealth or poverty. Other scholars argue that production methods alone do not account for social inequality. While the Neolithic lifestyle allowed for wealth differentials based on control over farmland or livestock, not all agricultural or pastoral societies were unequal. Inheritance practices may have played a key role in deepening inequalities by enabling the transmission and accumulation of wealth across generations.

As discussed above, burials and material culture do not provide strong evidence for social differentiation, though some indications exist. In the Early Natoufian, for example, this is seen in funerary goods, such as necklaces made of shell dentals found with approximately 8% of individuals, as well as in potential communal buildings at Mallaha and large mortars carved into bedrock, possibly for use in communal feasting rituals. For the Pre-Ceramic Neolithic, D. Pryce and O. Bar-Yosef argue that the "cult of skulls" was primarily reserved for a limited elite, reflecting a social hierarchy. They reject the idea that mortuary practices aimed at social homogenization, pointing instead to the occasional presence of prestige goods—such as obsidian—in select burials as evidence of higher status.[3] More elaborate tombs, such as those at Ba'ja, do exist, though they remain isolated cases.

Rather than seeking signs of social stratification in burials or elite residences—as is typical for later periods—some researchers suggest looking at the capacity of Neolithic societies to organize collective projects, such as the construction of sanctuaries or the colonization of Cyprus. These may reflect the influence of leaders or organizers. In this context, feasts are interpreted not as mechanisms of cohesion but as sources of inequality. These communal events were often sponsored by elites, possibly linked to construction activities at the sites where they occurred. The distribution of food may have functioned as a form of payment, allowing elites to display their generosity and prestige. According to B. Hayden, competition among leaders to host the most lavish feasts could have driven increases in food production, and played a significant role in the emergence of agriculture and animal husbandry.

Even if the presence of an elite overseeing collective endeavors is acknowledged, the application of the term "chieftaincy" to this period is generally contested. Leadership appears to have been more temporary and situational, rather than institutionalized. While some evidence of hierarchy can be inferred from ritual or administrative practices, this does not exclude the possibility of more egalitarian organizational forms, such as heterarchy.

The Ceramic Neolithic appears to continue this trajectory of increasing complexity. Nevertheless, a study of the Halaf culture suggests that social stratification remained limited. Housing showed little differentiation, the society was largely semi-sedentary, domestic architecture dominated, burial practices revealed minimal social distinction, and craft production was embedded within domestic settings. This society is generally considered egalitarian, although the presence of chiefs and more defined social divisions has also been proposed. Clearer indications of emerging complex societies, approaching chieftaincy, are most visible in the Mesopotamian region, particularly in the Samarra culture and its continuation in the Ubaid culture of the Chalcolithic period.

=== Gender and neolithization ===
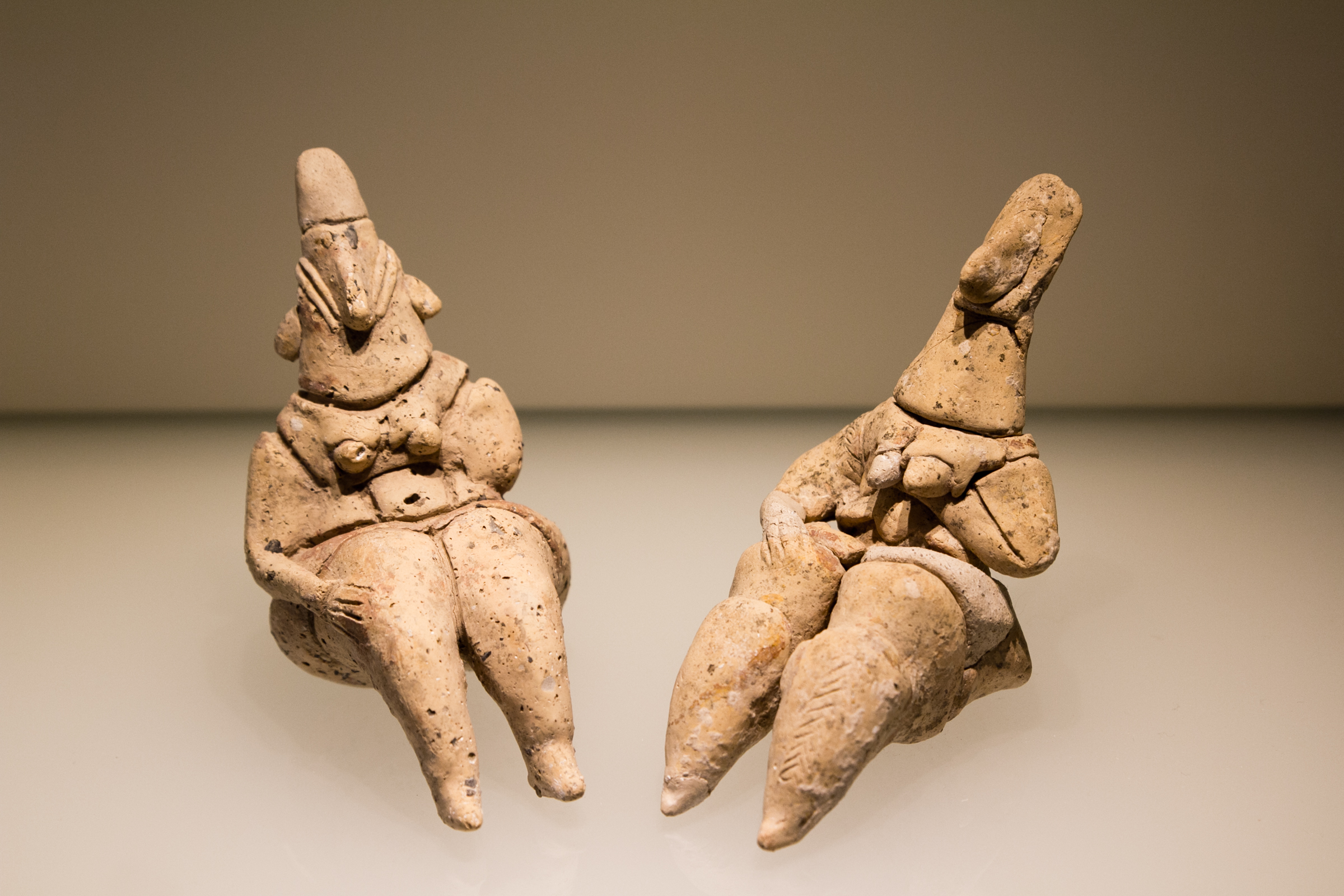
Female statuettes from Sha'ar Hagolan. Israel Museum.

The question of the cohesion of Neolithic societies also encompasses the relationship between men and women.

Historically, two opposing interpretations of gender relations during the Neolithic have been proposed. One presents an optimistic view, portraying the period as one of harmonious coexistence in which women were valued for their maternal and nurturing roles. The other adopts a more pessimistic stance, suggesting that the advent of sedentism and the agricultural economy led to a deterioration in the status of women, due to a stronger division between public and private spheres, relegating women to domestic roles, assigning them more arduous tasks, and reinforcing social inequalities between the sexes. However, archaeological studies increasingly discourage the generalization of such evolutionary models, instead revealing varied situations across different regions. Research in this area is more advanced in the southern and northern Levant than elsewhere.

In terms of the division of labor, ethnographic studies of agricultural societies indicate that women were often responsible for much of the fieldwork, including sowing, harvesting, and cleaning. This has led to the hypothesis that women may have played a key role in the initial domestication of plants. While men could assist with these tasks, they were more commonly involved in labor-intensive activities and hunting, though it was not unusual for women—and children—to participate in collective hunts. Women also carried out the processing of agricultural products. This is supported by a study of skeletal remains at Abu Hureyra by T. Molleson, which shows that women exhibit more pronounced physical markers associated with squatting and grinding activities, including stress on the knees, wrists, toes, and lower back. However, other studies of later southern Levantine sites do not reveal marked differences in activity-related stress between men and women. J. Peterson interprets this as evidence of regional variation in gender differentiation.

Changes in spatial organization have also been studied in relation to gender roles. K. Wright argues that the end of the PPNB saw a concentration of cooking facilities (ovens, fireplaces, grinding and cooking tools) inside domestic spaces, whereas earlier they had been located outside, near doorways. She interprets this shift as indicative of the privatization of domestic tasks and an intensification of these activities, which may have negatively affected women, who were commonly responsible for them. Nonetheless, there is no definitive evidence that women were exclusively involved in domestic work in Neolithic societies of the Near East.

Health studies in the southern Levant suggest that women in the Natoufian period lived longer than their Neolithic successors. This may be linked to increased fertility associated with sedentarization and the beginnings of agriculture, as inferred from ethnographic comparisons. For men, the opposite trend is observed, likely reflecting the lower risks associated with the sedentary farming lifestyle compared to that of mobile hunters. No significant differences are observed in trauma between the sexes.

In ritual and funerary contexts, no clear distinctions in treatment between men and women are apparent, based on the current archaeological record. In the religious sphere, recent interpretations diverge from earlier theories centered on a nurturing "great goddess." Instead, recent studies highlight the prominence of masculinity and virility, especially in Anatolia, a phenomenon described by I. Hodder and L. Meskell as "phallocentrism". Voluptuous female figurines, rather than representing a goddess cult, are increasingly seen as reflecting a male gaze focused on the female body and sexuality.

According to J. Peterson, there is no definitive evidence for hierarchical relationships between men and women in the Neolithic societies of the southern Levant. Rather than attempting to establish overarching trends across all Neolithic contexts, it is more productive to emphasize the local specificities of each site and period studied.

=== Conflict and peace ===
Violence and armed conflict are recognized as significant mechanisms in the development of human societies, and their presence in the European Neolithic is well documented. In contrast, evidence from the Near Eastern Neolithic remains limited and open to divergent interpretations. As a result, this period is generally characterized as peaceful and has attracted relatively little scholarly attention in terms of conflict studies. However, this characterization has been challenged. According to O. Bar-Yosef and S. LeBlanc, the role of violence in the evolution of early Near Eastern societies may be underestimated. They point to several lines of evidence: the strategic placement of sites in locations with potential defensive advantages, trends toward increasing settlement density that could imply concerns for security, and the presence of defensive walls at some sites, such as Magzalia and Hacilar. Weapons, including arrowheads—sometimes found in substantial quantities, such as a cache of 100 at Beidha—and slingshot bullets, with at least 1,000 found at Umm Dabaghiyah, are also common and may indicate use in conflict rather than hunting. Regular episodes of site abandonment could, in part, be attributed to violence. Additionally, some skeletal remains show trauma that may be linked to violent encounters, though this has not been a major focus of analysis to date.

It has been suggested that archaeological interpretation itself may have contributed to a "pacified" image of the Near Eastern Neolithic, as the same clues can support different conclusions. For example, the notion that the organization of Anatolian sites such as Aşıklı Höyük, Çatal Höyük, and Hacilar had a defensive purpose has been contested. Defensive structures may have served other functions, such as protection from flooding—as proposed by O. Bar-Yosef in the case of the PPNA wall at Jericho,—or may have acted as symbolic boundaries or means of controlling movement.

More broadly, interpretations of evidence for violence involve complex theoretical considerations. Some researchers suggest that the processes of domestication and the diffusion of the Neolithic lifestyle imply peaceful forms of interaction and knowledge-sharing, rather than societies dominated by extended feuds or inter-group warfare. However, it is also possible that the expansion of Neolithic communities in Anatolia came at the expense of local hunter-gatherer groups, involving more conflictual dynamics. In prehistoric contexts, violence is often explained in terms of Malthusian theory—as a consequence of overpopulation and competition for resources. Nevertheless, such conditions have not been clearly demonstrated for the Near East. Ultimately, the issue also touches on ethological perspectives on human nature, namely whether humans are inherently predisposed toward peace or conflict.

=== Diffusion of the Neolithic way of life ===
The Near Eastern Neolithic, originating from various focal points—primarily the northern and southern Levant, and southeastern Anatolia—spread rapidly to neighboring regions. By the Pre-Pottery Neolithic B (PPNB), the Neolithic lifestyle had reached from Anatolia to the central Zagros. This expansion continued in multiple directions: eastward across the Iranian plateau, then into Central Asia and the Indian subcontinent; northward into the Caucasus; westward into western Anatolia and Europe; and southward into Arabia and Egypt. This diffusion can be traced by the presence of key Neolithic elements, particularly the cultivation of wheat and barley and the domestication of goats and cattle, whose wild ancestors and early domestication traces are found exclusively in the Near East. There are various interpretations regarding the mechanisms and reasons behind this diffusion. One prominent debate contrasts two models: the "demic" diffusion (or migrationist) model, which suggests that the spread of Neolithic practices occurred through migration—whether colonization or conquest—of farming populations from Neolithic areas into non-Neolithic regions; and the "cultural" diffusion model, which emphasizes the transmission of agricultural practices through contact, exchange, and borrowing, with little or no migration. However, the situation likely varied from region to region, and it is challenging to apply a singular explanatory model across all regions or even within a single locality.

Genetic studies conducted in the mid-2010s offer some insights into the spread of the Neolithic lifestyle. These studies suggest that the movement of Neolithic populations across the Near East involved migration. Populations from the Southern Levant, Central Anatolia, and the Zagros, which were genetically distinct from local hunter-gatherer groups, dispersed in several directions. Over time, these populations intermingled to such an extent that by the Chalcolithic and Bronze Ages, individuals with genetic markers from multiple regions could be identified. Specifically, Southern Levantine populations spread to East Africa, Central Anatolian populations moved into Europe, and Zagros populations expanded into Central Asia and South Asia.

Cyprus presents an atypical case, as the island appears to have been uninhabited during the Epipaleolithic. While it was visited by mainland populations during the PPNA, the island's settlement occurred only later, during the PPNB, around 8500 BCE. These settlers likely came from the northern Levant, bringing with them aspects of the Neolithic "package," though it was still in an unfinished state. The lithic industry, art styles, and practices such as ritual skull removal were similar to those of the mainland, though the domesticated plants and animals, including cats, were not yet fully domesticated. The presence of fallow deer also suggests that some animals were introduced to Cyprus in a controlled, semi-domesticated state, with full domestication occurring later. This has led to debate about whether these animals were partially domesticated or introduced at different stages.

The reasons behind these Neolithic expansions are often attributed to a combination of climatic factors and demographic pressures. Neolithic groups, believed to have had higher population growth and greater demographic dynamism, may have been compelled to move into non-Neolithic border regions where there was more available land. J. Cauvin proposes that this movement was also driven by a cultural impetus—a form of "messianism" on the part of the settlers, who were potentially seen as more advanced by surrounding hunter-gatherer groups. The Neolithic settlers brought domesticated animals, plants, ceramics, and other technologies, which could have been perceived as superior by those they encountered, even if agriculture was not necessarily more efficient than gathering in sustaining human populations.

== See also ==
- Neolithic
- Ancient Near East
- Animals in the Ancient Near East
- Pre-Pottery Neolithic
- Pre-Pottery Neolithic A
- Pre-Pottery Neolithic B
- Prehistory of the Levant
- Prehistory of Anatolia
- Prehistory of Mesopotamia
- Prehistory of Iran
- Origins of agriculture in West Asia

== Bibliography ==
=== General bibliography ===
==== Prehistory, Neolithic ====
- Renfrew, Colin, ed. (2014). The Cambridge World Prehistory. Cambridge: Cambridge University Press.
- Foster McCarter, Susan (2007). Neolithic. New York: Routledge.
- Demoule, Jean-Paul, ed. (2009). La révolution néolithique dans le monde [The Neolithic Revolution around the world] (in French). Paris: CNRS éditions.
- Guilaine, Jean (2011). Caïn, Abel, Ötzi: L'héritage néolithique [Cain, Abel, Ötzi: The Neolithic heritage]. NRF - Bibliothèque des Histoires (in French). Paris: Gallimard.

==== Ancient Near East ====
- Matthews, Roger (2003). The Archaeology of Mesopotamia : Theories and Approaches: (Approaching the Ancient World). Routledge. ISBN 978-0-415-25317-8.
- Huot, Jean-Louis (2004). Une archéologie des peuples du Proche-Orient: tome I, des peuples villageois aux cités-États (Xe-IIIe millénaire av. J.-C.) [An archaeology of the peoples of the Near East: Volume I, from village peoples to city-states (10th–3rd millennium BC)] (in French). Paris: Errance.
- Potts, Daniel T., ed. (2012). A Companion to the Archaeology of the Ancient Near East. Blackwell companions to the ancient world. Oxford: Blackwell Publishers.
- Killebrew, Ann E.; Steiner, Margreet, eds. (2013). The Oxford Handbook of the Archaeology of the Levant: c. 8000–332 BCE. Oxford: Oxford University Press.
- Sauvage, Martin, ed. (2020). Atlas historique du Proche-Orient ancien [Historical Atlas of the Ancient Near East] (in French). Paris: Les Belles Lettres.

==== Near Eastern Neolithic: introductory articles ====
- Simmons, Alan H. (2015). "Early agriculture in Southwest Asia". In Barker, Graeme; Goucher, Candice (eds.). The Cambridge World History: Volume II: A World With Agriculture. Cambridge: Cambridge University Press. pp. 210–242.
- Belfer-Cohen, Anna; Goring-Morris, A. Nigel (2018). "La néolithisation du Proche-Orient" [Neolithization in the Near East]. In Demoule, Jean-Paul; Garcia, Dominique; Schnapp, Alain (eds.). Une histoire des civilisations: Comment l'archéologie bouleverse nos connaissances [A history of civilizations: How archaeology is revolutionizing our knowledge] (in French). Paris: La Découverte. pp. 188–194.
- Watkins, Trevor (2018). "From Mobile Foragers to Complex Societies in Southwest Asia". In Scarre, Chris (ed.). The Human Past: World Prehistory and the Development of Human Societies (4th ed.). London: Thames & Hudson. pp. 198–229.
- Akkermans, Peter M. M. G. (2020). "Prehistoric Western Asia". In Radner, Karen; Moeller, Nadine; Potts, Daniel T. (eds.). The Oxford History of the Ancient Near East, Volume 1: From the Beginnings to Old Kingdom Egypt and the Dynasty of Akkad. New York: Oxford University Press. pp. 27–94.

==== Neolithic of the Near East: synthesis works ====
- Aurenche, Olivier; Kozlowski, Stefan K. (2015). La naissance du Néolithique au Proche-Orient [The birth of the Neolithic in the Near East]. Biblis (in French). Paris: CNRS Editions. ISBN 978-2-271-08601-3.
- Cauvin, Jacques (1997). Naissance des divinités, naissance de l'agriculture: La Révolution des symboles au Néolithique [Birth of divinities, birth of agriculture: The Neolithic Symbol Revolution]. Champs (in French). Flammarion. ISBN 978-2-08-081406-7.
- Simmons, Alan H. (2007). The Neolithic Revolution in the Near East: Transforming the Human Landscape. Tucson: University of Arizona Press.

=== Studies by region ===
==== Levant and Syria ====
- Akkermans, Peter M. M. G.; Schwartz, Glenn M. (2003). The Archaeology of Syria: From Complex Hunter-Gatherers to Early Urban Societies (c.16,000–300 BC). Cambridge: Cambridge University Press.
- Goring-Morris, A. Nigel; Belfer-Cohen, Anna (October 2011). Goring-Morris, A. Nigel; Belfer-Cohen, Anna (eds.). "Neolithization Processes in the Levant: The Outer Envelope". Current Anthropology. 52 (S4 "The Origins of Agriculture: New Data, New Ideas"): 195–208. doi:10.1086/658860. JSTOR 10.1086/658860.
- Belfer-Cohen, Anna; Goring-Morris, A. Nigel (October 2011). Goring-Morris, A. Nigel; Belfer-Cohen, Anna (eds.). "Becoming Farmers: The Inside Story". Current Anthropology. 52 (S4 "The Origins of Agriculture: New Data, New Ideas"): 209–220. doi:10.1086/658861. JSTOR 10.1086/658861.
- Simmons, Alan H. (2012). "The Levant". In Potts, Daniel T. (ed.). A Companion to the Archaeology of the Ancient Near East. Blackwell companions to the ancient world. Oxford: Blackwell Publishers.
- Banning, E. B. (2012). "The Southern Levant". In Potts, Daniel T. (ed.). A Companion to the Archaeology of the Ancient Near East. Blackwell companions to the ancient world. Oxford: Blackwell Publishers.
- Bartl, Karin (2012). "The Northern Levant". In Potts, Daniel T. (ed.). A Companion to the Archaeology of the Ancient Near East. Blackwell companions to the ancient world. Oxford: Blackwell Publishers.
- Akkermans, Peter (2013). "The Northern Levant During the Neolithic Period: Damascus and Beyond". In Killebrew, Ann E.; Steiner, Margreet (eds.). The Oxford Handbook of the Archaeology of the Levant: c. 8000–332 BCE. Oxford: Oxford University Press. pp. 134–146.
- Bar-Yosef, Ofer (2014). "The Origins of Sedentism and Agriculture in Western Asia". In Renfrew, Colin (ed.). The Cambridge World Prehistory. Cambridge: Cambridge University Press. pp. 1408–1438.
- Munro, Natalie D.; Grosman, Leore (2014). "The Forager–Farmer Transition in the Southern Levant (ca. 20000–8500 cal. BP)". In Yasur-Landau, Assaf; Cline, Eric H.; Rowan, Yorke (eds.). The Social Archaeology of the Levant: From Prehistory to the Present. Cambridge: Cambridge University Press. pp. 47–66.

==== Cyprus ====
- Clarke, Joanne (2013). "Cyprus During the Neolithic Period". In Killebrew, Ann E.; Steiner, Margreet (eds.). The Oxford Handbook of the Archaeology of the Levant: c. 8000–332 BCE. Oxford: Oxford University Press. pp. 183–199.

==== Anatolia ====
- Schmidt, Klaus (2012). "Anatolia". In Potts, Daniel T. (ed.). A Companion to the Archaeology of the Ancient Near East. Blackwell companions to the ancient world. Oxford: Blackwell Publishers. pp. 144–160.
- Baird, Douglas (2012). "The Late Epipaleolithic, Neolithic, and Chalcolithic of the Anatolian Plateau, 13,000 – 4000 BC". In Potts, Daniel T. (ed.). A Companion to the Archaeology of the Ancient Near East. Blackwell companions to the ancient world. Oxford: Blackwell Publishers. pp. 431–465.
- Özdoğan, Mehmet (2014). "Anatolia: From the Pre-Pottery Neolithic to the End of the Early Bronze Age (10,500–2000 BCE)". In Renfrew, Colin (ed.). The Cambridge World Prehistory. Cambridge: Cambridge University Press. pp. 1508–1544.

==== Mesopotamia ====
- Aurenche, Olivier; Kozlowski, Stefan K. (2000). "Continuités, convergences, influences et innovations dans la Préhistoire récente de la Mésopotamie" [Continuities, convergences, influences and innovations in the recent prehistory of Mesopotamia]. In Guilaine, Jean (ed.). Premiers paysans du monde. Naissance des agricultures [The world's first farmers. The birth of agriculture] (in French). Paris: Errance. pp. 83–95.
- Oates, Joan (2014). "Prehistory and the Rise of Cities in Mesopotamia and Iran". In Renfrew, Colin (ed.). The Cambridge World Prehistory. Cambridge: Cambridge University Press. pp. 1474–1497.
- Campbell, Stuart (2012). "Northern Mesopotamia". In Potts, Daniel T. (ed.). A Companion to the Archaeology of the Ancient Near East. Blackwell companions to the ancient world. Oxford: Blackwell Publishers. pp. 415–430.

==== Iran ====
- Weeks, Lloyd R. (2013). "The Development and Expansion of a Neolithic Way of Life". In Potts, Daniel T. (ed.). The Oxford Handbook of Ancient Iran. Oxford: Oxford University Press. pp. 49–75.
- Helwing, Barbara (2014). "East of Eden? A review of Turkey's Eastern neighbors in the Neolithic". In Ozdogan, Mehmet; Basgelen, Nezih; Kuniholm, Peter (eds.). The Neolithic in Turkey: 10500–5200 BC: Environment, Settlement, Flora, Fauna, Dating, Symbols of Belief, with Views from North, South, East and West. Istanbul: Arkeoloji Sanat. pp. 321–377.

=== Other studies ===
- Testart, Alain (2010). Avant l'histoire: L'évolution des sociétés, de Lascaux à Carnac [Before history: The evolution of societies, from Lascaux to Carnac]. NRF (in French). Gallimard.
- Peterson, Jane (2010). "Domesticating gender: Neolithic patterns from the southern Levant". Journal of Anthropological Archaeology. 29 (3): 249–264. doi:10.1016/j.jaa.2010.03.002.
- Aurenche, Olivier; Kozlowski, Janusz K.; Kozlowski, Stefan K. (2013). "To be or not to be... Neolithic: "Failed attempts" at Neolithization in Central and Eastern Europe and in the Near East, and their final success (35,000–7000 BP)". Paléorient. 39 (2): 5–45. doi:10.3406/paleo.2013.5519.
- Demoule, Jean-Paul (2017). Naissance de la figure: L'art du paléolithique à l'âge du Fer [Birth of the figure: Art from the Paleolithic to the Iron Age]. Folio Histoire (in French). Paris: Gallimard.
- Verhoeven, Marc (2011). "Retrieving the Supernatural: Ritual and Religion in the Prehistoric Levant". In Insoll, Timothy (ed.). The Oxford Handbook of the Archaeology of Ritual and Religion. Oxford: Oxford University Press. pp. 795–810.
