= Akarçay =

Village in Birecik district of Şanlıurfa Province, Turkey

- Neighbourhood
- Location in Turkey Akarçay (Şanlıurfa)
- Coordinates: 36.9192°N 38.0269°E
- Country: Turkey
- Province: Şanlıurfa
- District: Birecik
- Population (2022): 611
- Time zone: UTC+3 (TRT)

Akarçay is a neighbourhood of the municipality and district of Birecik, Şanlıurfa Province, Turkey. Its population is 611 (2022). It has a number of archaeological sites in the vicinity.

== Geography ==
Akarçay is located by the Euphrates, along a seasonal stream that dries up in the summer. The Birecik Dam and Karkamış Dam are both located nearby. The prevailing climate is a semiarid Mediterranean climate with dry summers and most rainfall happening in winter. Botanically, Akarçay is located in a transitional zone between the Irano-Turanian Region and the Mediterranean Region, with the Irano-Turanian flora predominating. The plant cover is characteristic of steppe regions; members of the Asteraceae family.

Some plants documented in Akarçay's immediate

surroundings include the flowering plants Ixiolirion tataricum, Eminium rauwolffii, Scutellaria orientalis, Moluccella laevis, Verbascum kotschyi, Heliotropium bovei, Anagallis arvensis, Rhagadiolus hamosus, Hedypnois cretica, Catananche lutea, Centaurea iberica, Sedum caespitosum, and Potentilla reptans, Ranunculus asiaticus, Ranunculus damascenus, Ranunculus ficaria, Adonis flammea, Papaver syriacum, Papaver argemone, Fumaria officinalis, Thlaspi perfoliatum, Isatis lusitanicus, Descurainia sophia, Minuartia decipiens, Dianthus strictus, Silene chaetodonta, Gypsophila ruscifola, Gypsophila antari, and Chenopodium album. Also there are several wild legumes such as Trigonella mesopotamica (related to fenugreek), Lens orientalis (a type of lentil, and Astragalus russellii. There are also various grasses such as Melica persica, Cynodon dactylon, and Hordeum marinum;

== Archaeology ==
=== Akarçay Tepe ===
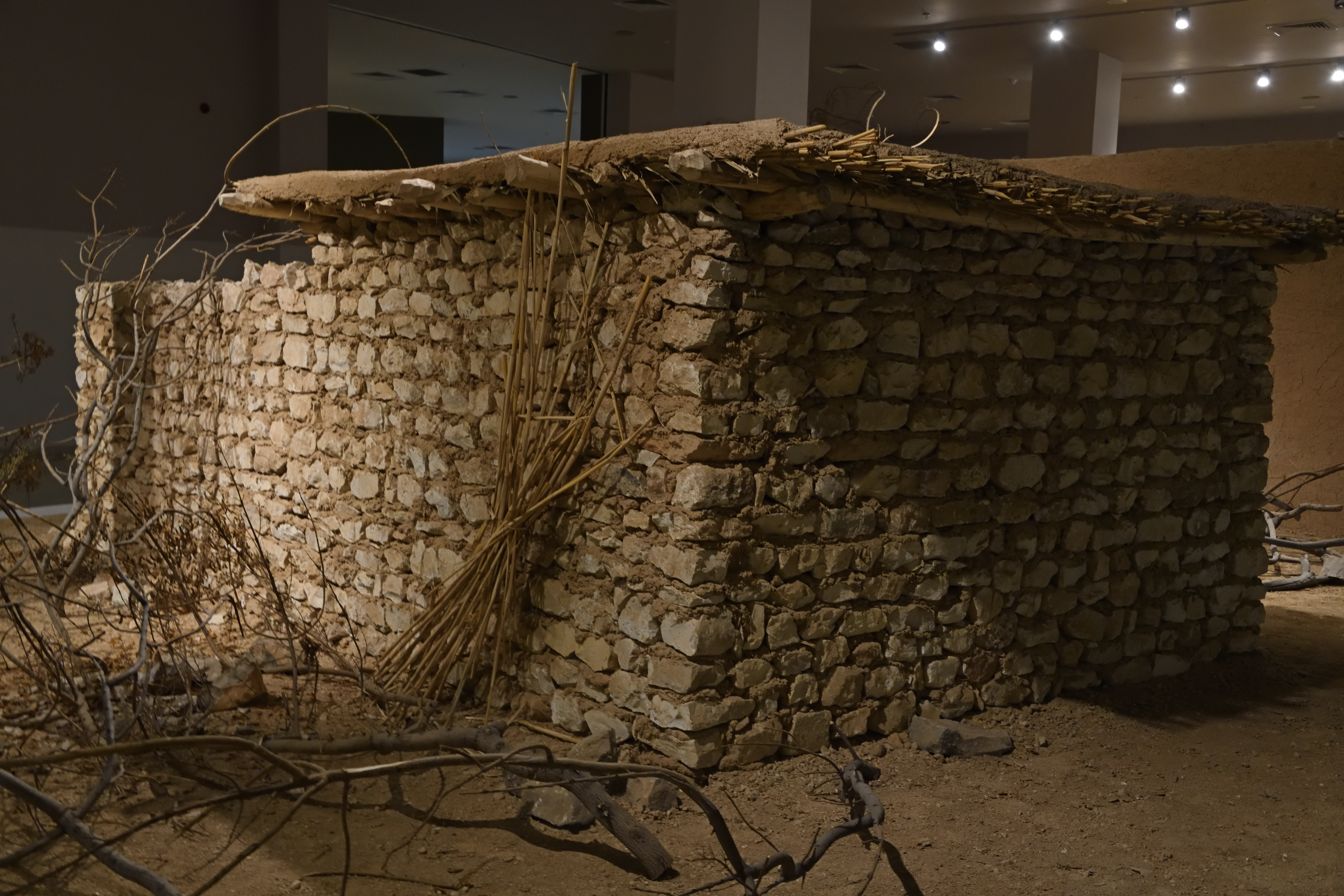
Reconstruction of a house from Akarçay Tepe

Akarçay Tepe is a small, flattish, oval-shaped mound located west of the village. Along with nearby Mezraa Teleilat, it is one of the oldest known settlements in the Euphrates basin. It was first identified in 1989 by a team led by G. Algaze, who found Paleolithic flint tips and drill bits were found before any excavation took place. In 1998, a team led by Nur Balkan-Atlı surveyed the site; they then began excavation in 1999. In 2001, M. Özdoğan and N. Karul conducted further research at Akarçay Tepe and dated various artifacts found here to the Ubaid period, Late Chalcolithic, Iron Age, Neolithic, Pre-Pottery Neolithic, and Pottery Neolithic.

The tepe consists of 7 layers, with the top being a "mixed" layer and the others being numbered Phase I through VI. The youngest and uppermost layer, Phase I, has been radiocarbon dated to c. 6225–6015 BCE, in the Copper Age. Below it is Phase II, which is dated to c. 6455–6200 BCE, spanning the end of the Pottery Neolithic up to the beginning of the Halaf period in the early Chalcolithic. Phase III is a "transitional" phase dated to c. 7185–6515 BCE. Below it is Phase IV, which is dated to c. 7595–7145 BCE, in the terminal Pottery Neolithic. Phase V is dated to c. 7940–7610 BCE, in the late Pottery Neolithic. Phase VI, the bottom layer, has not been radiocarbon dated but is estimated to belong to the middle Pre-Pottery Neolithic.

Another site, known as Akarçaytepe 2, is located 250 m northeast of Akarçay Tepe, on both sides of the Su Dere. This is 300 m north of Akarçay village. It was first identified by G. Algaze's team in 1989, who identified finds from the Ubaid and Uruk periods of the Chalcolithic, along with the Middle Bronze Age.

=== Akarçay Höyük ===
Akarçay Höyük is a medium-sized mound, measuring 180×160 m, located 900 m south of Akarçay village. In Algaze's team's 1989 survey, pottery shards from the Early and Middle Bronze Age, Hellenistic period, Roman period, and Byzantine period were found here. Salvage excavations were conducted in 1998 under Y. Mergen and A. Deveci, and these excavations uncovered Early Bronze Age "metallic ceramics" samples, similar to ones found at Hayaz and Samsat. Then in 2001 a team led by M. Özdoğan and N. Karul uncovered Late Neolithic, Late Chalcolithic, and Byzantine-era artifacts. There is also a 13th–14th century CE cemetery at the site.

=== Other sites ===
- Gre Virike: a small mound, measuring 60×70 m in diameter and 15 m in height, located near the village. First identified in 1989 by G. Algaze and then surveyed in 1998 by A.T. Ökse, who found artifacts dated to the Late Chalcolithic and Early Bronze Age. Ökse then did a salvage excavation here in 1999 and concluded that the settlement at Gre Virike served as a cult center for surrounding villages during the Early Bronze Age. Özdoğan and Karul also did surface examinations here in 2001 and found various Early through Late Chalcolithic as well as Early and Middle Bronze Age.
- Gre Virike Yanı: first identified by G. Algaze in 1989; Özdoğan and Karul did a surface inspection in 2001 and they found items dated from the Iron Age.
- Karakız Höyük: surface examinations by Özdoğan and Karul at this small mound produced finds dated to the Ubaid phase of the Chalcolithic, Early and Middle Bronze Age, Iron Age, and Roman and Byzantine periods.
- Gre Gavuran: surface examinations by Özdoğan and Karul at this small mound produced finds dated to the Late Neolithic, Late Chalcolithic, Early and Middle Bronze Age, Iron Age, and Roman period.
- Kızmağarası Höyük: surface examinations by Özdoğan and Karul at this small mound produced finds dated to the Late Neolithic, Early-Middle Bronze Age, and Roman and Byzantine periods.
- Kırmızı Dere area: Hellenistic, Roman, and Byzantine finds in surface examinations by Özdoğan and Karul, with the Hellenistic finds predominating.
- Site located "opposite Şahinler Mahalle": surface examinations produced finds dated to the Paleolithic, Early-Middle Bronze Age, Roman, and Byzantine periods.
- Site located at the base of Habip Tepe: surface examinations by Özdoğan and Karul at this small mound produced finds dated to the Late Paleolithic, Iron Age, and Byzantint period.
