= Birecik =

- District and municipality
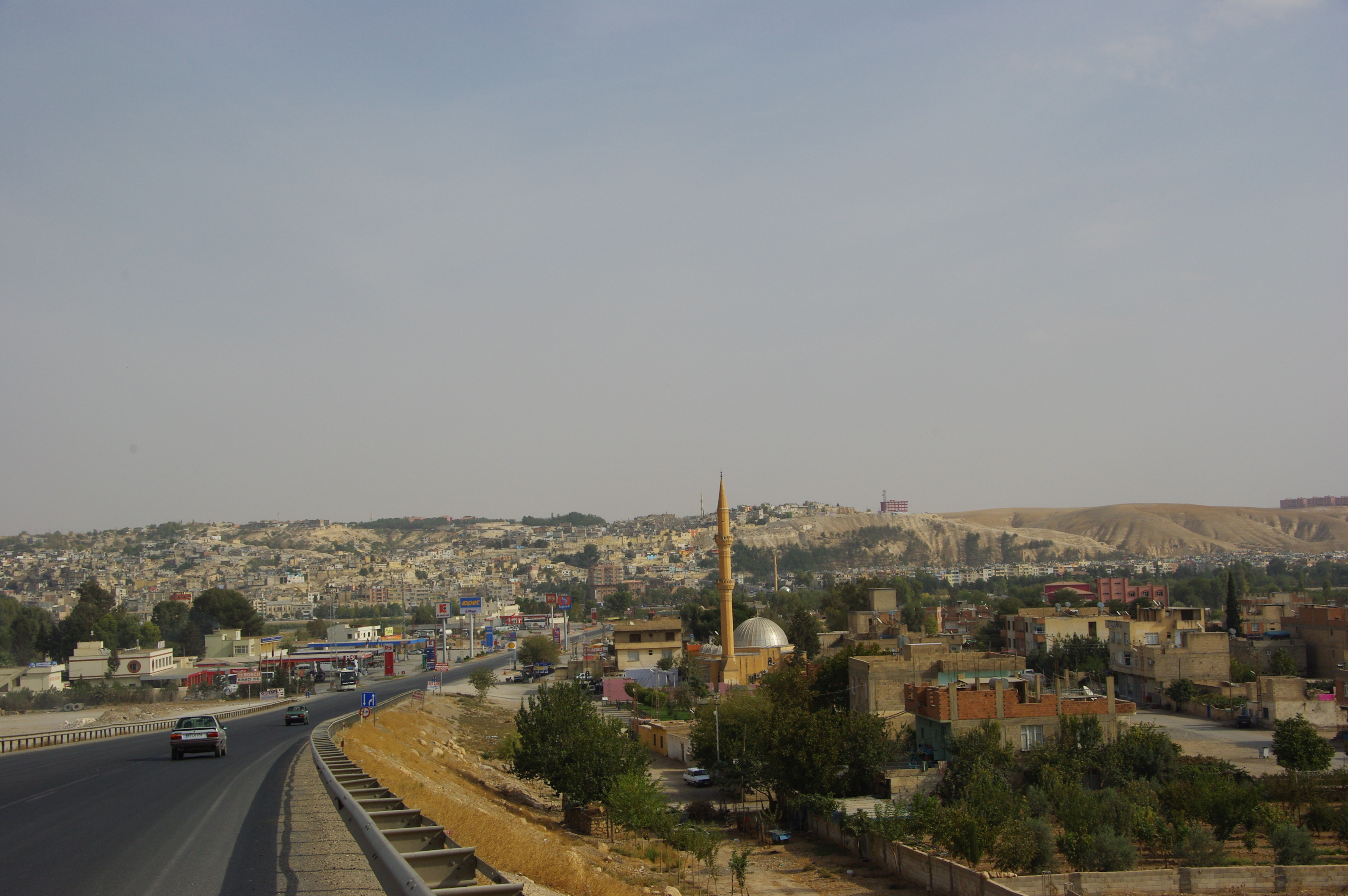

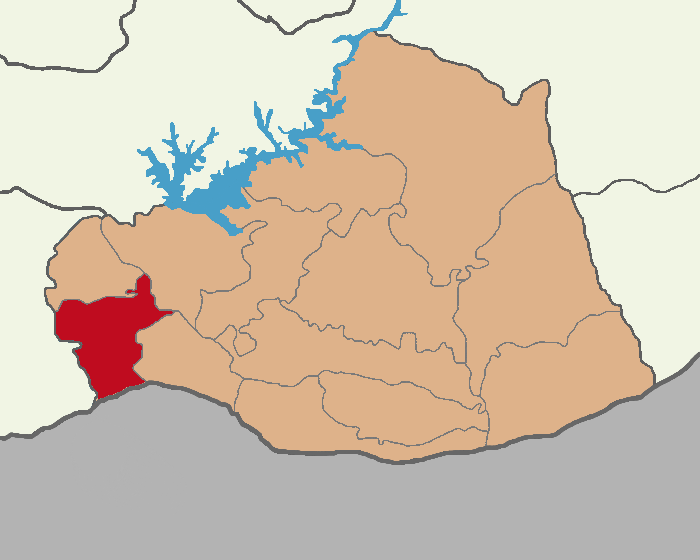
- Map showing Birecik District in Şanlıurfa Province

- Location within Turkey Location within Şanlıurfa
- Coordinates: 37°01′30″N 37°58′37″E
- Country: Turkey
- Province: Şanlıurfa

Government
  - Mayor: Mehmet Begit (Ind.)
  - Kaymakam: Mustafa Gürbüz
- Area: 912 km^{2} (352 sq mi)
- Elevation: 450 m (1,480 ft)
- Population (2023): 93,866
  - Density: 103/km^{2} (267/sq mi)
- Time zone: UTC+3 (TRT)
- Postal code: 63400
- Area code: 0414
- Website: www.birecik.bel.tr

Birecik (Note: Local Turkish: Berecig; Arabic: البيرة, romanized: al-Bīrah; Kurdish: Bêrecûk) (from the Arabic and Syriac al-Bīrah, meaning fortress) is a municipality and district of Şanlıurfa Province, Turkey. Its area is 912 km^{2}, and its population is 93,866 (2023). It lies on the Euphrates.

Built on a limestone cliff 400 ft. high on the left/east bank of the Euphrates, "at the upper part of a reach of that river, which runs nearly north-south, and just below a sharp bend in the stream, where it follows that course after coming from a long reach flowing more from the west".

== Etymology ==
The historical name of the town, al-Bīra in Arabic and Bīreh in Syriac, derives from the Aramaic Bīrthā, meaning fortress. It later evolved to Birecik with the addition of the Turkish diminutive suffix, cik. It is called Belejik amongst the local population. In Ottoman times, the historical forms Bi'retü'l-Fırat, Biğrecik, and Biğrecek are also attested.

== Geography ==
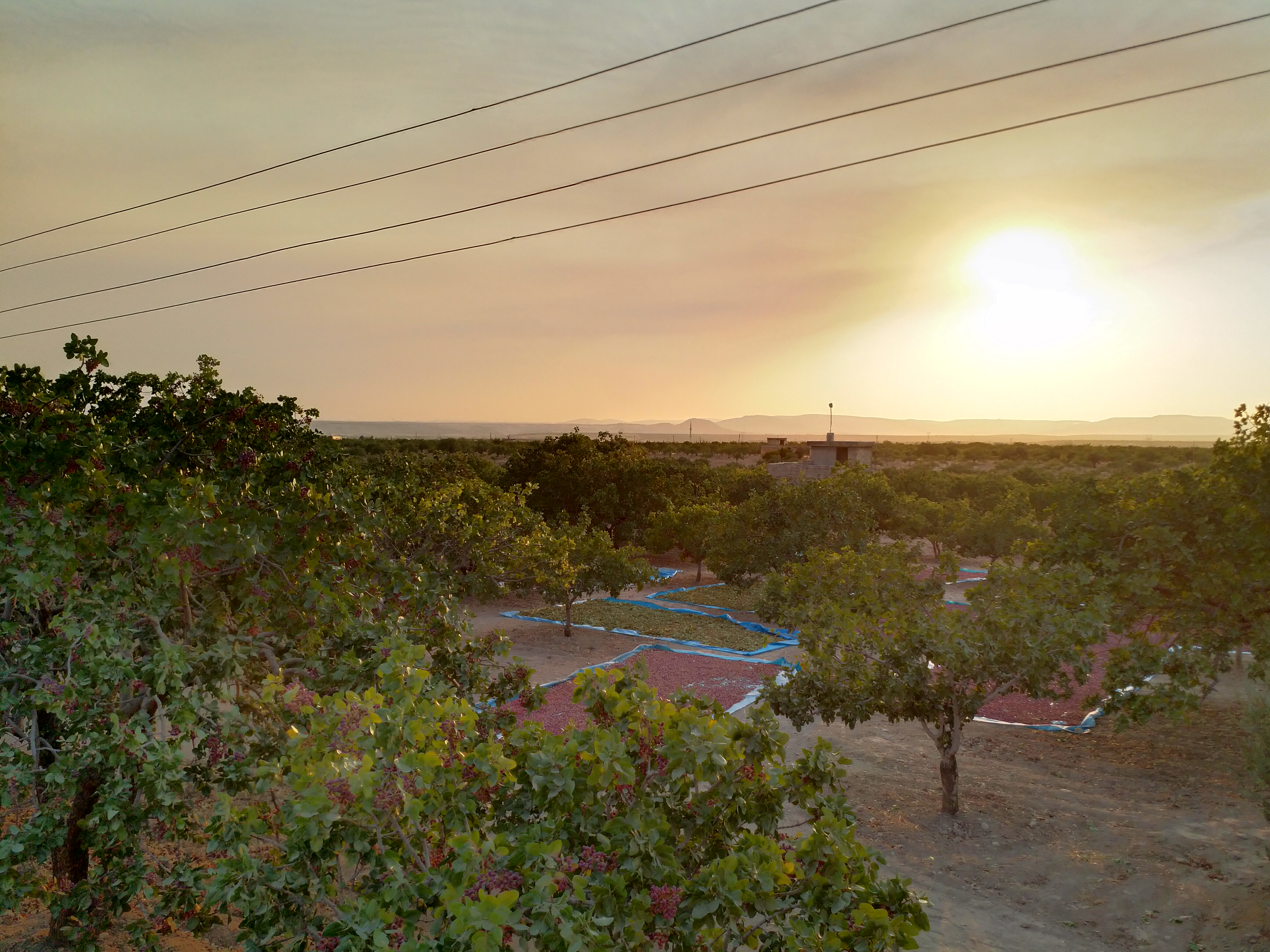
Pistachio orchard near Birecik

Birecik is located between Gaziantep to the west and the Urfa plateau to the east.

The region's elevation varies between about 400 and 500 meters above sea level, with steep slopes along the banks of the Euphrates. Low-lying areas are used for farming; the higher areas are used for livestock grazing. Cotton growing is common in the Birecik area. There are no major tributaries of the Euphrates in the area, although there are some minor streams such as the Kerzin Çayı (located about 8 km south of Birecik), Hamomin Dere, Yedigöz Dere, and Pırpar Dere.

=== Geology ===
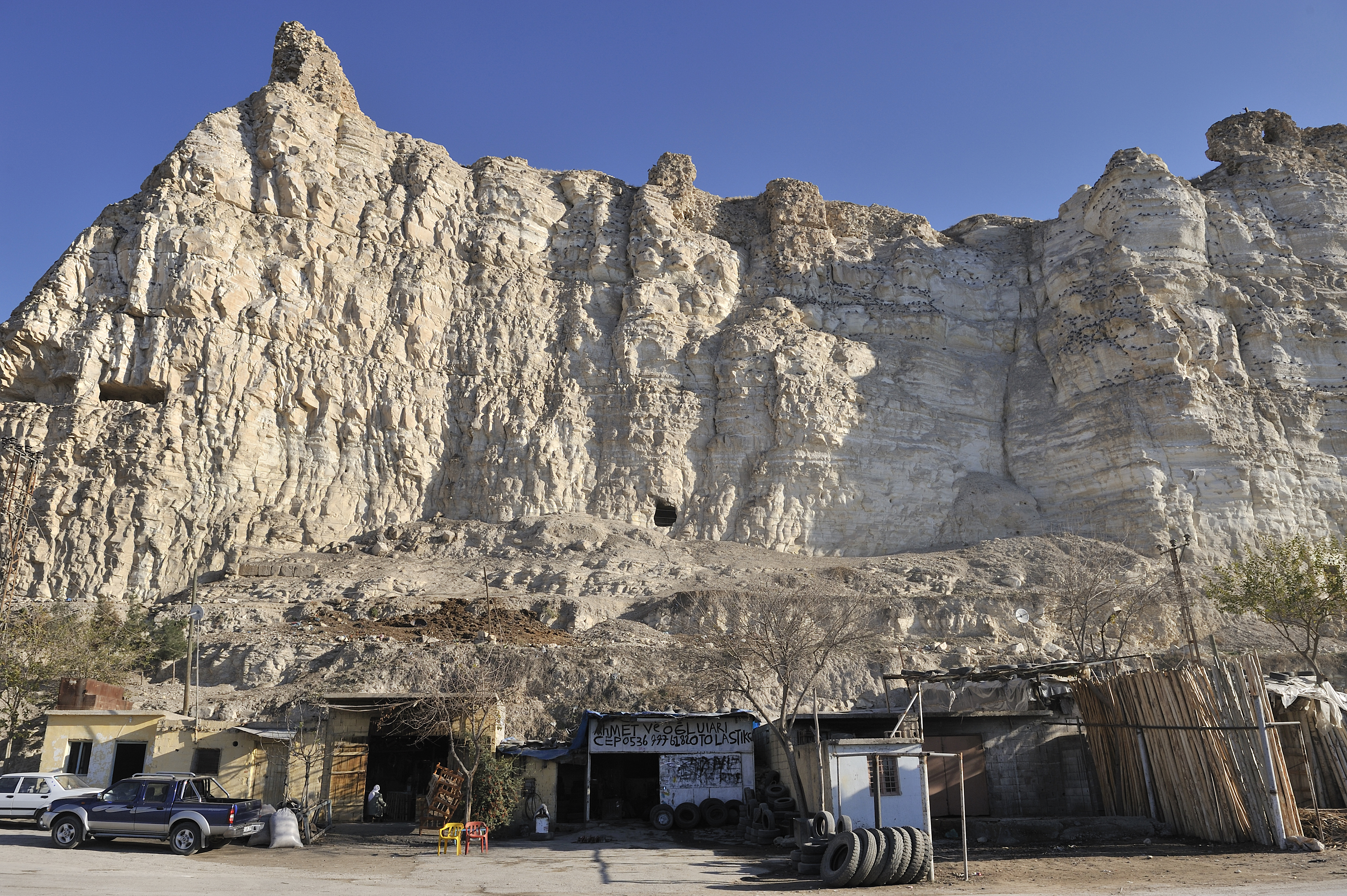
Limestone outcroppings at Birecik

The lowest geological layer in the Birecik area is the Gaziantep Formation, which dates to Eocene through Oligocene times. Large exposed outcroppings of formation this exist around Birecik and along the Euphrates. It consists of gray, soft to medium-hard chalky limestone, marl, clayey limestone, and limestone.

The upper levels of the Gaziantep Formation contain a distinct karstic limestone member. This limestone member was deposited in a shallow marine environment during Eocene-Oligocene times. Karstic springs have formed in these deposits. The transition between this unit and the rest of the Gaziantep Formation is not always clearly discernible. The closest areas to Birecik where this unit is visible are at Kalazan Dağı, Arat Dağı, and the heights to the west of ancient Zeugma.

Above the Gaziantep Formation is a basalt formation which covers a large area between Birecik and Suruç. This basalt formation was formed from basalt flows during Pliocene times. By this time, the Birecik area was no longer underwater – during the Middle and Late Miocene, tectonic activity had uplifted the region above sea level. Major basalt outcroppings exist at Arat Dağı, Karadağ, and north of Suruç. To a lesser extent, there are also outcroppings west of the Euphrates.

Most of the underlying basalt and limestone formations are now covered by more recent alluvial deposits. There is also an alluvial plain along the Euphrates, formed by clay, sand, silt, and gravel deposited during floods. This area is about 3 km wide around Birecik but only 1 km wide further north near ancient Zeugma. To the west of the Euphrates, there are also fluvial terraces.

=== Climate ===
Birecik has a semi-arid climate (Köppen: BSh), which borders a mediterranean climate. The average annual temperature in Birecik is 18.2 °C (64.8 °F), and average annual precipitation is 354 millimetres (13.9 in).

Climate data for Birecik (1991–2020)
Month	Jan	Feb	Mar	Apr	May	Jun	Jul	Aug	Sep	Oct	Nov	Dec	Year
Mean daily maximum °C (°F)	11.5 (52.7)	13.6 (56.5)	18.5 (65.3)	24.0 (75.2)	30.5 (86.9)	36.7 (98.1)	40.6 (105.1)	40.1 (104.2)	35.3 (95.5)	28.6 (83.5)	19.7 (67.5)	13.3 (55.9)	26.1 (79.0)
Daily mean °C (°F)	6.2 (43.2)	7.5 (45.5)	11.6 (52.9)	16.3 (61.3)	22.1 (71.8)	27.9 (82.2)	31.4 (88.5)	30.5 (86.9)	25.5 (77.9)	19.4 (66.9)	11.9 (53.4)	7.6 (45.7)	18.2 (64.8)
Mean daily minimum °C (°F)	1.9 (35.4)	2.6 (36.7)	5.2 (41.4)	9.0 (48.2)	13.4 (56.1)	18.2 (64.8)	21.2 (70.2)	20.4 (68.7)	15.6 (60.1)	11.4 (52.5)	5.9 (42.6)	3.2 (37.8)	10.7 (51.3)
Average precipitation mm (inches)	60.52 (2.38)	53.77 (2.12)	44.54 (1.75)	38.9 (1.53)	23.05 (0.91)	6.4 (0.25)	0.37 (0.01)	0.96 (0.04)	2.7 (0.11)	20.52 (0.81)	42.86 (1.69)	59.87 (2.36)	354.46 (13.96)
Average precipitation days (≥ 1.0 mm)	7.5	7.5	6.9	5.5	3.9	1.6	1.0	1.1	1.6	3.3	5.2	7.1	52.2
Average relative humidity (%)	71.4	68.0	62.6	58.5	51.1	42.6	41.7	44.7	48.0	55.6	66.6	72.6	56.8
Source: NOAA

== Archaeology ==
Birecik Dam Cemetery is an Early Bronze Age cemetery near Birecik. It was used extensively for about 500 years at the beginning of the third millennium BC. More than 300 graves were excavated here in 1997 and 1998. The site was discovered during the building of the Birecik Dam as part of the GAP project.

The cemetery was used between 3100-2600 BC.

Early archaeological inspection in the Birecik area was done in 1894 by J.E. Gauiter. Later, in 1946, K. Kökten conducted a survey of the area and found traces of Middle Paleolithic occupation. Another survey was done in 1989 by a team headed by G. Algaze. Among the sites first identified by the Algaze survey were Akarçay Tepe and Mezraa Teleilat, which are two of the oldest known settlements in the Euphrates basin. In 1998, with the pending construction of a dam, excavations were done on sites that would be inundated once the dam was completed. More Middle Paleolithic findings were encountered by a team headed by M. Özdoğan and N. Karul in 2001.

== History ==
=== Antiquity ===
The 1911 Encyclopædia Britannica identified Birecik with ancient Apamea or its suburb Seleucia and described it as opposite Zeugma, with which it was connected by a bridge of boats. At the same time, it added that "the place seems to have had a pre-Seleucid existence as Birtha, a name which revived under Roman rule". Later discoveries have shown that the identification with Apamea and its Zeugma (the word zeugma meant junction and referred to a junction of roads at a point where a pontoon bridge crossed a river) is false: Bali, some 17 kilometres upstream is now seen as the site of Zeugma, and there may have been no bridge of boats at Birtha/Birecik until the crossings at Zeugma and at Tell-Ahmar (further down) lost popularity. These, rather than the crossing at Birecik/Birtha may therefore be what the 1911 publication said "was used from time immemorial in the passage from North Syria to Haran (Charrae), Edessa and North Mesopotamia, and was second in importance only to that at Thapsacus, by which crossed the route to Babylon and South Mesopotamia."

The placing of Apamea-Zeugma further upstream and the identification of Birecik with Roman Birtha was already stated in the American Journal of Archaeology in 1917; and William Smith's Dictionary of Greek and Roman Geography (1854) clearly identified Birtha with Birecik, although at another point it seems to confuse it with "the Zeugma of Commagene", the province on the right/west bank of the river.

The name "Birtha" is found in no ancient Greek or Roman writer, although Bithra (Greek: Βίθρα) (probably meant for "Birtha") appears in the account by Zosimus of the invasion of Mesopotamia by Roman Emperor Julian in AD 363.

The Greeks at one stage called what is now Birecik by the name Macedonopolis (anglicized also as Makedonoupolis). The city represented by bishops at the First Council of Nicaea and the Council of Chalcedon is called by this name in Latin and Greek records, but Birtha in Syriac texts. A 6 AD inscription in Syriac found at Birecik contains an epitaph of Zarbian, "commander of Birtha".

Ancient Birtha grew when the ancient city of Carchemish (known as Europos to the Greeks) became abandoned; this had happened by the middle of the 4th century. Another possible impetus for Birtha's growth was when the Romans withdrew their legion from Zeugma after a Persian attack in the mid-3rd century; some of Zeugma's inhabitants may have moved to Birtha at that point. Although Birtha served as a crossing point on the Euphrates, the main crossing was still at Zeugma.

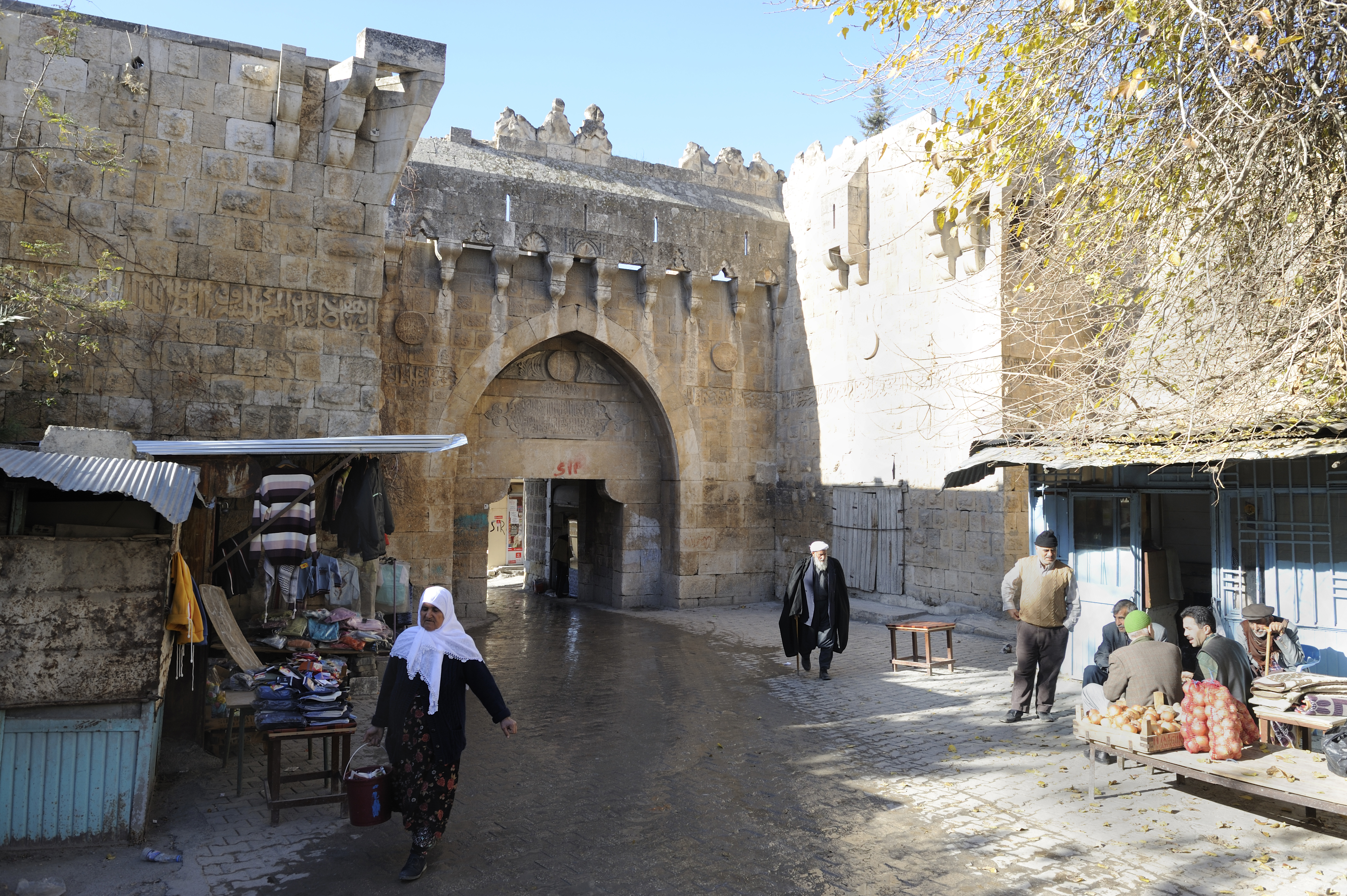
The Urfa Gate, the only remaining gate from the 15th-century walls of Birecik

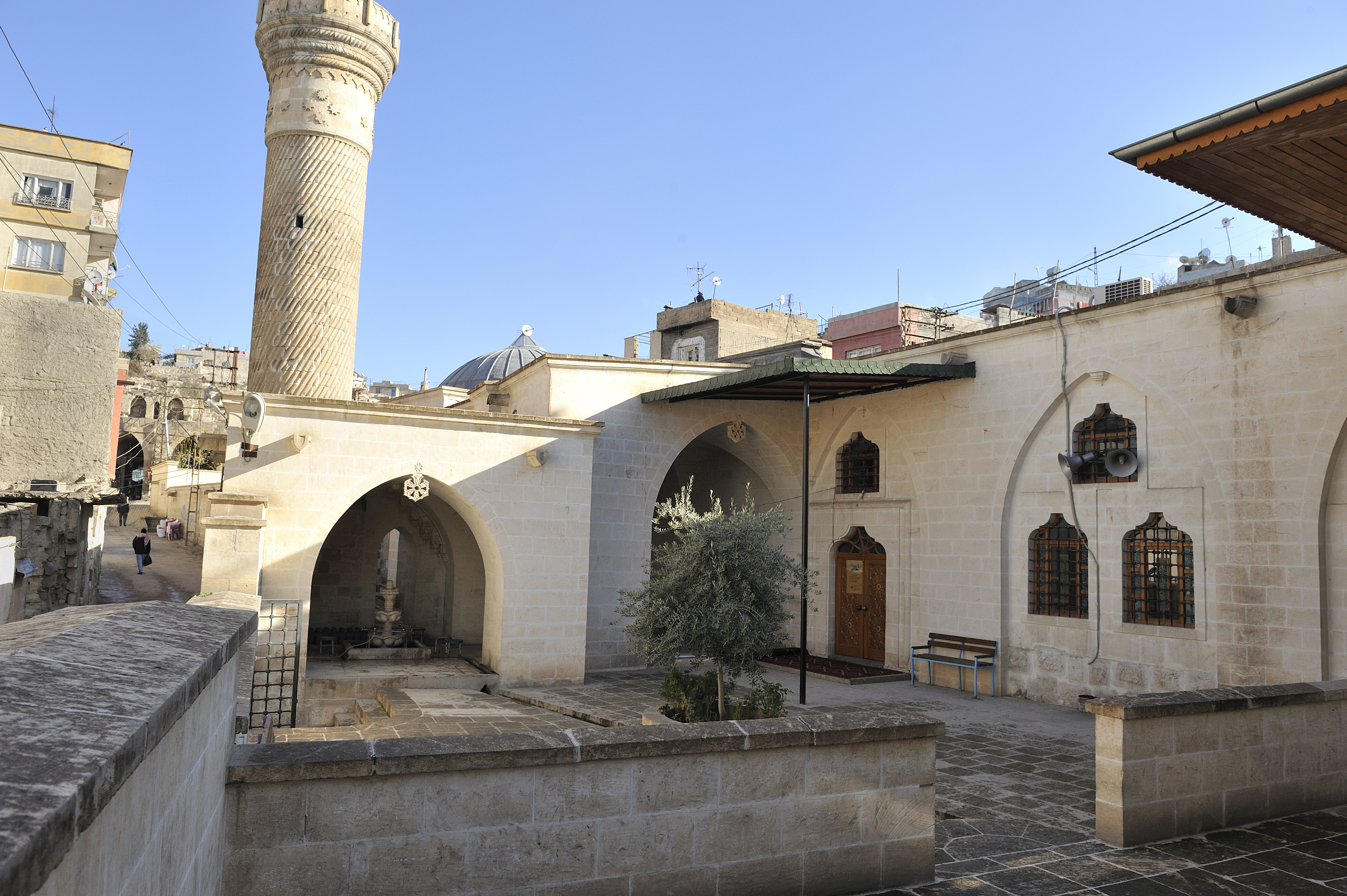
13th-century Ulu Camii mosque in Birecik

=== Medieval period ===
The town maintained its importance during medieval times as it protected the most important crossing of the Euphrates in northern Syria. The crossing at Zeugma was no longer used, and the traffic all went to Birecik instead. Zeugma's population had probably also moved to Birecik as well. Al-bira had been under control by the Muslim Arabs from 637 until 1079 when it was conquered by the Seljuk Turk warlord Tutush but at some point afterwards it was taken by the Armenians. When the First Crusade arrived in the region, the town was under control of the Armenian Ablgharib, who was a vassal to the Armenian ruler Kogh Vasil. Matthew of Edessa states that the army of Ablgharib numbered 1,000 and that he was eventually removed by the Franks. Matthew's account of this is suspect however as it seems that his daughter married the next lord, Galeran of Le Puiset of the Montlhery family, and it seems that Ablgharib's position was preserved to a certain extent. Birecik then formed part of the County of Edessa; it was strongly fortified with a castle and served as the capital of a minor feudal lordship.

In 1151, Birecik was captured by the Artukid ruler Timurtaş of Mardin, an ally of the Zengid ruler Nur ad-Din Zengi, and afterwards Birecik became part of Nur ad-Din's direct holdings. After Nur ad-Din died in 1174, Saladin conquered the whole region. Birecik formed part of the Kurdish Ayyubid principality of Aleppo; while other towns in the principality were assigned as sub-principalities (namely Tall Bashar and Aintab), Birecik was not and seems to have been governed directly from Aleppo by its Ayyubid governor, Az-Zahir Ghazi.

Birecik was later captured by the Mamluks under Baybars c. 1261. They repaired its castle in 1277-78 and again in 1300-01. Under the Mamluks, Birecik was one of the most important fortified garrisons in the region. A post route ran directly between Birecik and Aleppo. There was little traffic between Birecik and Rum Kale, another important stronghold located a bit to the north. Like Rum Kale, Birecik was not directly located on the frontier itself, but its value to the Mamluks was as a strong fallback position in case their border territories (in Bireci'ks case, Urfa) fell to the Mongols. Birecik wasn't very important commercially until the end of the 1300s, when some commercial traffic between Aleppo and Upper Mesopotamia began to follow the Birecik-Urfa route. It was unsuccessfully besieged by the Dulkadirid leader Sevli Beg in 1390.

In 1401, however, Timur crossed the Euphrates at Birecik on his way from Damascus to Malatya. The Mamluk commander of Birecik's castle submitted to Timur's forces, and it appeared that the town would be spared, but Timur left a contingent of about 3,000 troops in Birecik and they ended up looting the town and castle before leaving to rejoin Timur. Birecik gained in importance during the 1400s as the preferred route connecting Aleppo and Upper Mesopotamia shifted towards the Birecik-Urfa route instead of the Mardin-Ra's al-'Ayn route that had been preferred previously. Birecik was unsuccessfully put under siege in 1420 by the Ak Koyunlu leader Kara Yusuf. Again in 1472, the Ak Koyunlu leader Uzun Hasan attacked Birecik unsuccessfully, causing damage to the city walls. The Mamluk sultan, Qaitbay, later came to inspect the damage and ordered significant rebuilding of the walls.

=== Ottoman period ===
Toll revenue from Birecik (in guruş)
1520	1536	1552	1570
75,000	180,000	180,000	200,000

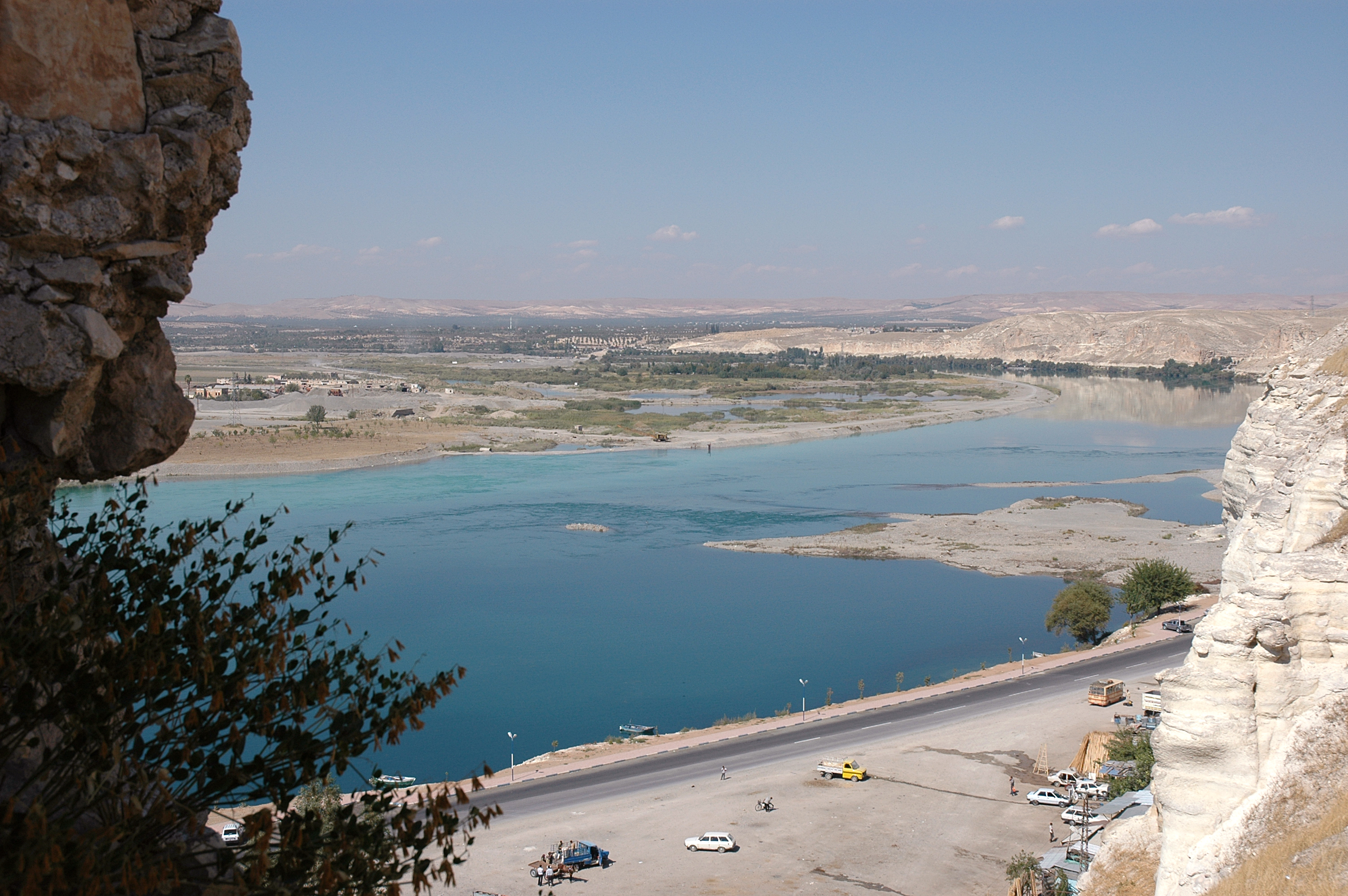
View of the Euphrates at Birecik

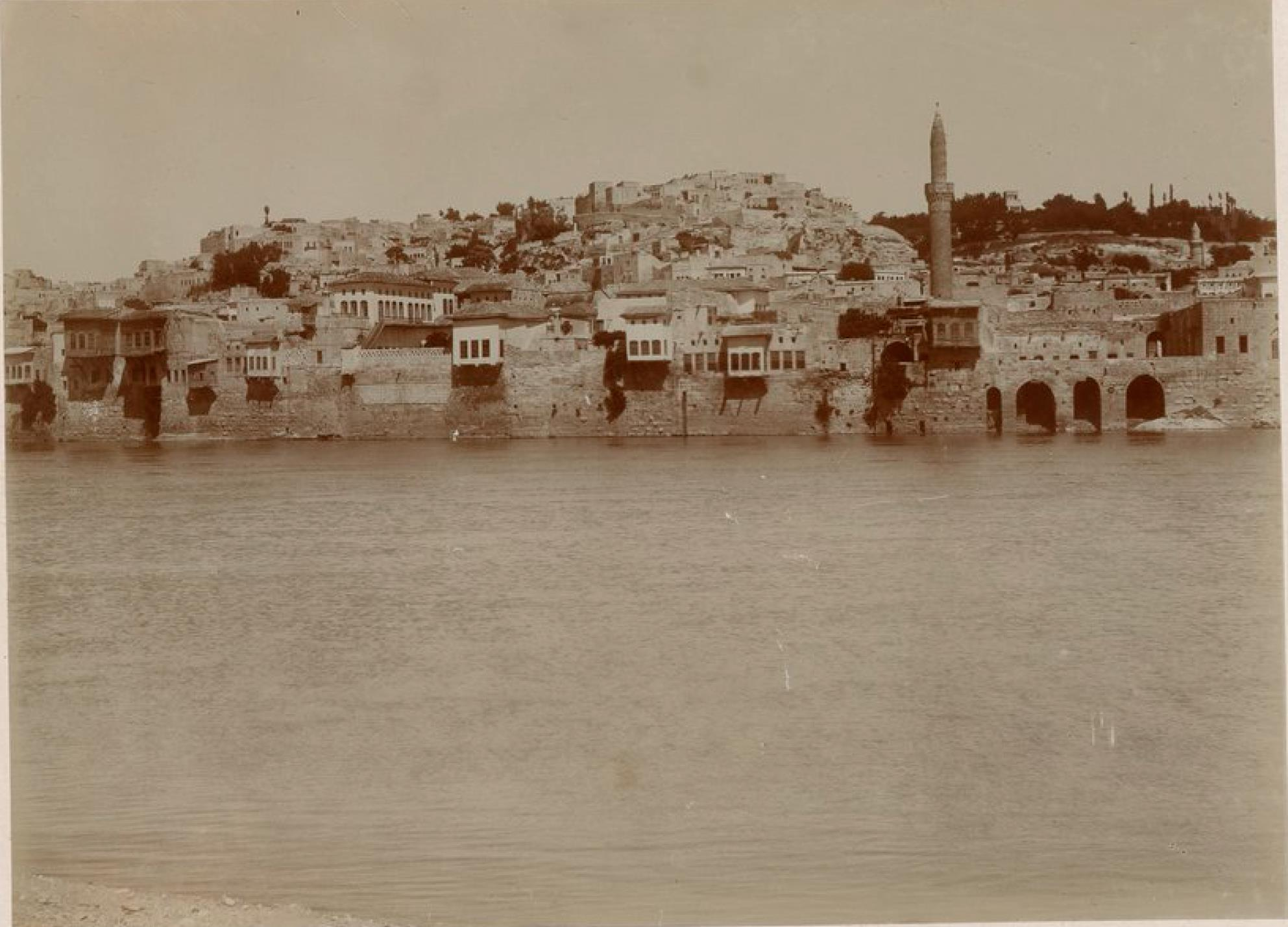
Birecik in 1904

Birecik became part of the Ottoman Empire in 1516. It already had a dock at the time that was collecting tolls; the income from the tolls rose dramatically after Suleiman the Magnificent's campaign to conquer Baghdad in 1534 (see table).

Meanwhile, by 1547 the Ottomans had chosen to make al-Bīra the site of a major imperial shipyard – the empire's first in Mesopotamia. Birecik's geography made it uniquely well-suited to play such a role: by the time it reaches Birecik, the Euphrates has already descended from the Taurus foothills, and the rest of its course consists of gentle slopes and wide valleys. In contrast, the Tigris has a steeper gradient at the same latitude, hindering navigation by larger ships. Towns on the upper Tigris like Diyarbakır or Cizre would have therefore been less suitable for a large naval base compared to Birecik. At the same time, Birecik has a wetter climate than settlements further downstream because it's closer to the Mediterranean coast in Syria, and the mountain regions nearby are able to support large mixed-growth forests to supply timber for shipbuilding. The city of Basra, despite having the advantage of being much further downstream and closer to the Persian Gulf, has a drier climate and therefore lacked a consistent supply of wood. The Portuguese explorer Pedro Teixeira noted this problem when he visited Basra in 1604: since importing timber was costly, locally-built ships were small and expensive. Although Basra did also become an Ottoman shipyard later on, Birecik had none of these disadvantages and remained the primary Ottoman shipyard in Mesopotamia.

The first reference to the Ottoman shipyard at Birecik is in June 1547, when an Arab merchant from Basra named Hajji Fayat reported to the Portuguese governor in Hormuz about it. Hajji Fayat specifically referred to the abundance of timber as one of the reasons why the "large and well-populated" town of Birecik was such an advantageous shipbuilding location. Around that time, the Birecik shipyard employed 45 tax-exempt workers. The first documented order for ship construction at Birecik dates from July 1552, when the Ottoman Imperial Council commissioned 300 new ships to be built.

In 1559, the Ottomans decided to deploy five new galliots at Basra to counter the presence of Portuguese ships near Ottoman ports, which was causing a decline in customs revenue. From October 1559 until February 1560, the Imperial Council wanted to build the ships at Birecik, but ultimately the vizier Sokullu Mehmed Pasha decided to send the materials to Basra instead and assemble the galliots there. The governor in Basra received the materials that summer. Later, as part of an ultimately unsuccessful attempt to reconquer Baghdad in 1629, the Ottoman vizier Hüsrev Pasha ordered 100 new ships to be built at Birecik.

=== Modern history ===
Birecik was the scene of an unusually cruel massacre and persecution of Armenians in 1895.

Birecik Dam and hydroelectric power plant, part of the Southeastern Anatolia Project, is situated within the district. The Roman city of Zeugma is now drowned in the reservoir behind the dam. Zeugma's famous mosaics, including the 'river god', have been taken to Gaziantep Museum, but some rescued remains of Zeugma are exhibited in Birecik. With its rich architectural heritage, Birecik is a member of the Norwich-based European Association of Historic Towns and Regions (EAHTR)

== Composition ==
There are 83 neighbourhoods in Birecik District:

- Abdallı
- Akarçay
- Akpınar
- Almaşar
- Altınova
- Arslanlı
- Aşağı Eşme
- Aşağı Fatmacık
- Aşağı Habib
- Aşağı Karkutlu
- Aşağı Kuyucak
- Aşağıalmaşar
- Ayran
- Bağlarbaşı
- Bahçeönü
- Bentbahçesi
- Böğürtlen
- Bozdere
- Boztepe
- Cibinören
- Çiçekalan
- Çiftlikköy
- Çoğan
- Cumhuriyet
- Dağgören
- Dalocak
- Damlıca
- Diktepe
- Dışlık
- Divriği
- Dorucak
- Duyduk
- Düzlüce
- Ekenek
- Geçittepe
- Göktepe
- Günışığı
- Güvenir
- Güzelyurt
- Han
- Haydarahmet
- Hocaşerif
- Ilgar
- İnceler
- İncirli
- İncirlidere
- İnnaplı
- Karababa
- Karşıyaka
- Keskince
- Kocaali
- Kömağıl
- Konakköy
- Kural
- Kurtuluş
- Kurucahöyük
- Mengelli
- Merkez
- Meteler
- Meyanca
- Meydan
- Mezra
- Ortafatmacık
- Özveren
- Saha
- Sancak
- Şekerköy
- Sekili
- Söğürtlen
- Sumaklı
- Surtepe
- Tüten
- Uğurcuk
- Ünsal
- Yaylacık
- Yeniakpınar
- Yılmaz
- Yukarı Incirli
- Yukarı Karabaş
- Yukarıhabib
- Yukarıyeniçağ
- Yuvacık
- Ziyaret

== Demographics ==
In mid-19th century, Swiss traveler Alexander Schläfli recorded that Birejik had 5500-6000 people with 50-60 Armenian families and the rest being Turks. He further mentioned that Birejik was an ethnic and linguistic border, because to the east lived Kurdish tribes, to the west Turks-Turkmens, and to the south Arab tribes. In his travels, Julius Heinrich Petermann observed that the north and northeastern sides of the town were inhabited by Kurds, who partly lived in rock caves, while further south lived Turks and some Armenians.

== Architecture ==
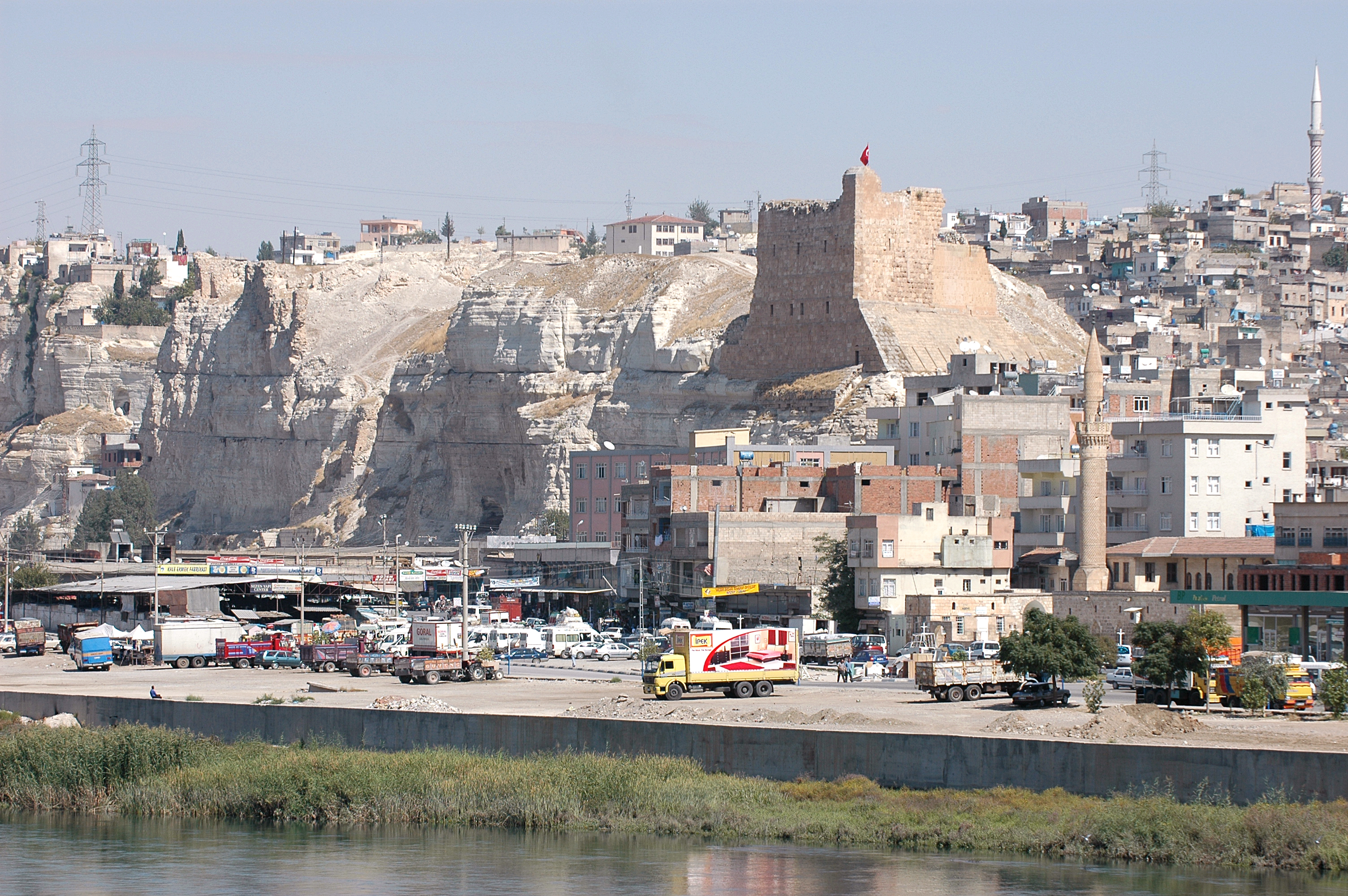
View of the castle

Historically, Birecik's urban fabric was made up of stone houses. The stone used in these houses was mostly derived from two sources. The first is limestone quarried from Kalazan Dağı, northwest of the city. This stone, which was also used to build other historical buildings in Birecik, is derived from the upper limestone member of the Gaziantep Formation and is resistant to weathering. Four old quarries at Kalazan Dağı have been identified. The other type main type, used particularly in later times, is the marly limestone known as havara coming from a quarry east of Birecik. This type is less resistant to weathering. In some buildings, both types of stone were used. More recently, Urfa limestone has also been used in restoration work on historic buildings. One example is the Mahmutpaşa Cami, which now has examples of all three types of stone.

=== Qanat ===
An old qanat, estimated to be 30 km long, historically brought water to Bireck for drinking, irrigation, water mills, and other uses. The exact source of the water is not known – locals believe it comes from Arat Dağı, but a survey by Gürpinar et al was unable to verify this. Gürpinar et al guessed that the ultimate source for the water is the karstic reservoir in the limestone member of the Gaziantep Formation.

The main tunnel of the qanat is about 1.5 m in diameter and about 2-10 m below the surface. Its course is dug in a thick and relatively soft layer of rock that forms part of the Gaziantep Formation, and it stands without supports. Vertical wells were dug at several points along the qanat's course so they could access the water. Water flows through the qanat at a rate of approximately 20 liters per second.

=== Castle ===
Birecik Castle (in Turkish: Birecik Kalesi) is built on a clayey limestone hill that belongs to the Gaziantep Formation. Rockfall caused by erosion of the hill has happened in some areas. The castle itself is built out of limestone quarried from Kalazan Dağı to the northwest.

== Bishopric ==
As an episcopal see, Birtha was a suffragan of the metropolitan see of Edessa, the capital of the Roman province of Osrhoene. This is attested in a Notitia Episcopatuum of 599, which assigns to it the first place among the suffragans.

The names of three of its bishops are recorded in extant documents. Mareas signed the acts of the First Council of Nicaea in 325 as bishop of Macedonopolis, The chronicle of Michael the Syrian speaks of a Daniel of Birtha at the Council of Chalcedon in 451, while Giovanni Domenico Mansi calls him bishop of Macedonopolis. The Chronicle of Joshua the Stylite tells of a Bishop Sergius of Birtha who was entrusted by the Emperor Anastasius I Dicorus with refortifying the city, something that must have occurred after peace was made with the Persians in 504. The work was completed by Justinian.

No longer a residential bishopric, Birtha is today listed by the Catholic Church as a titular see.

== Gallery ==
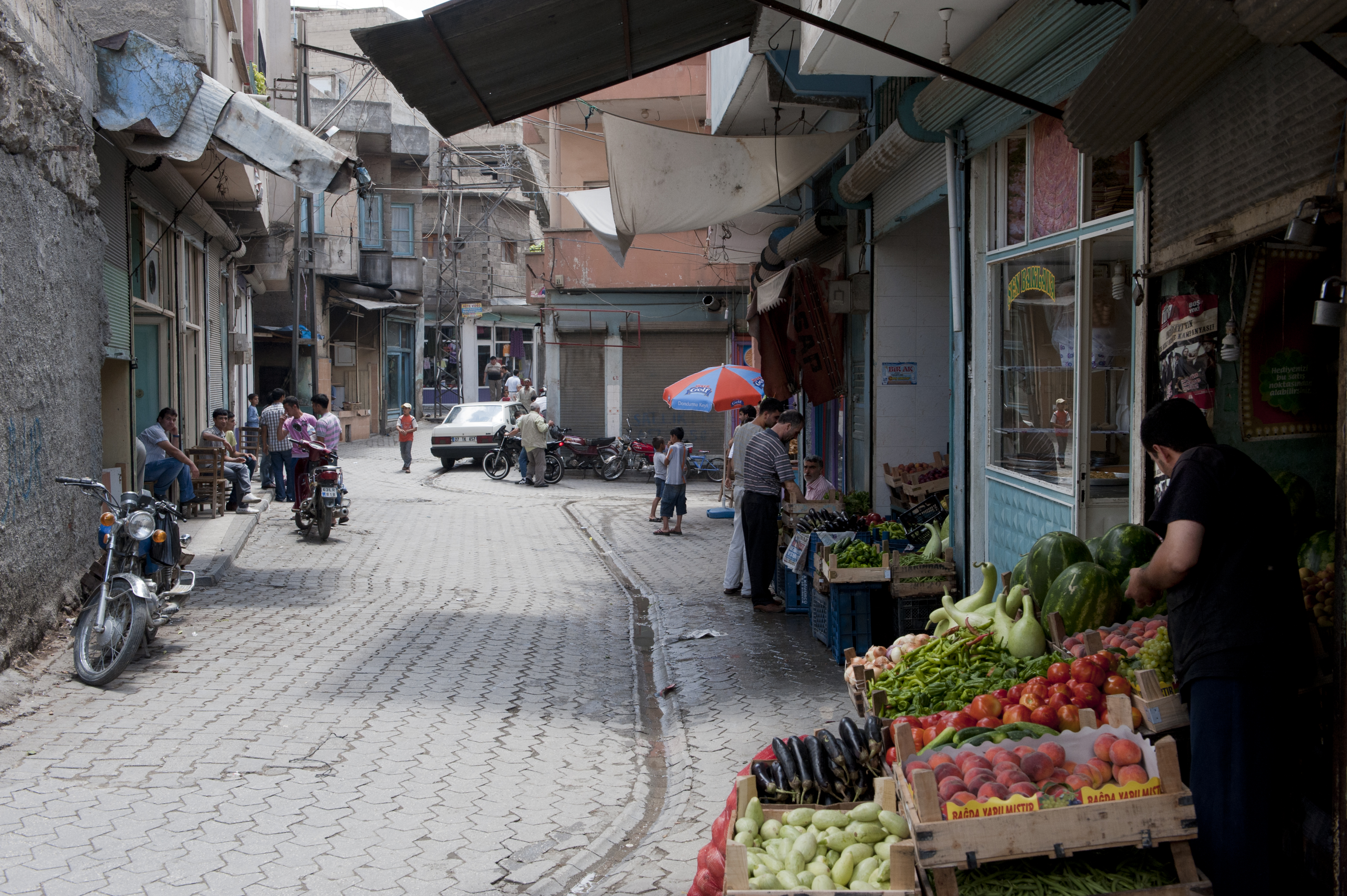

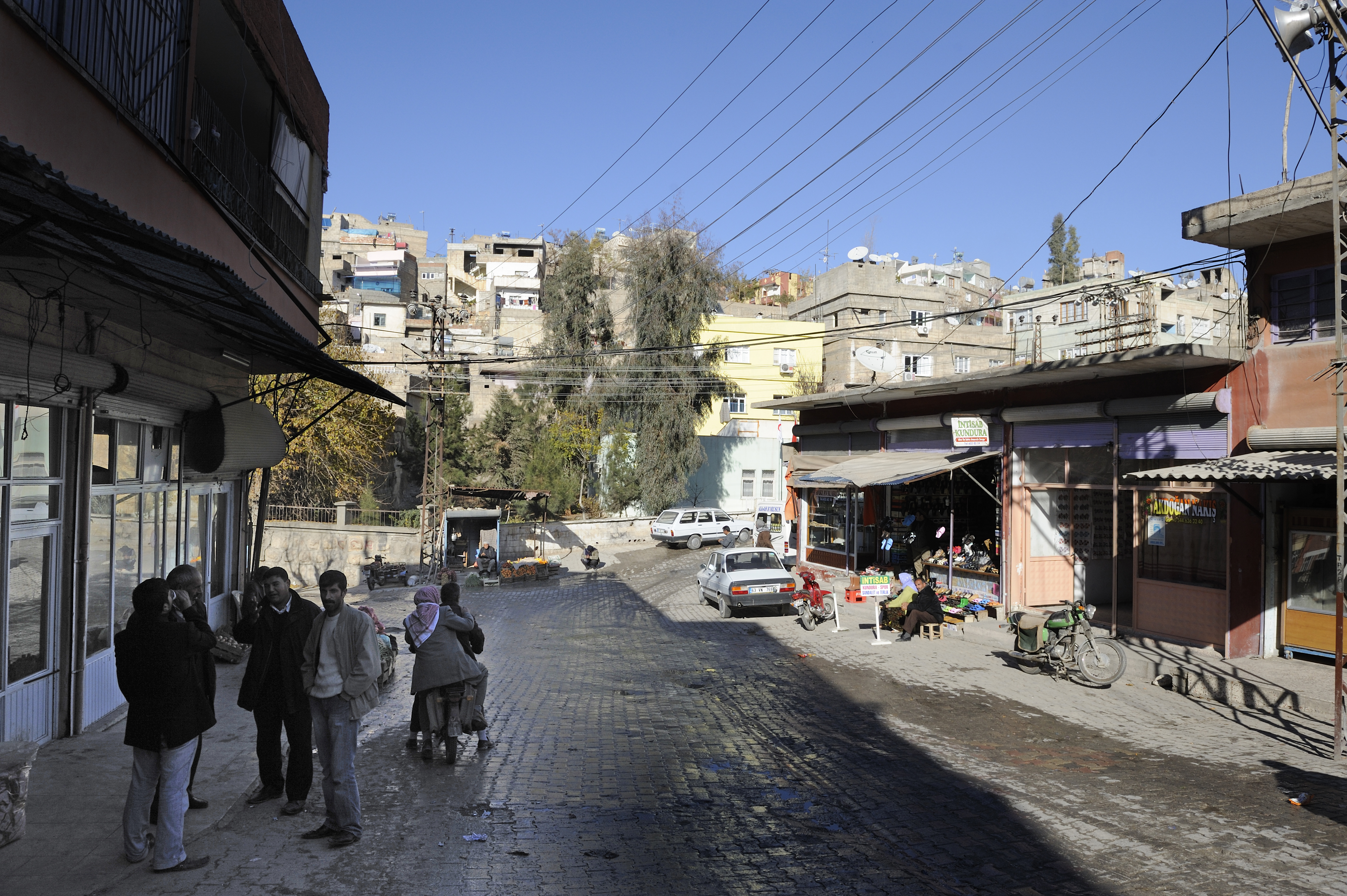

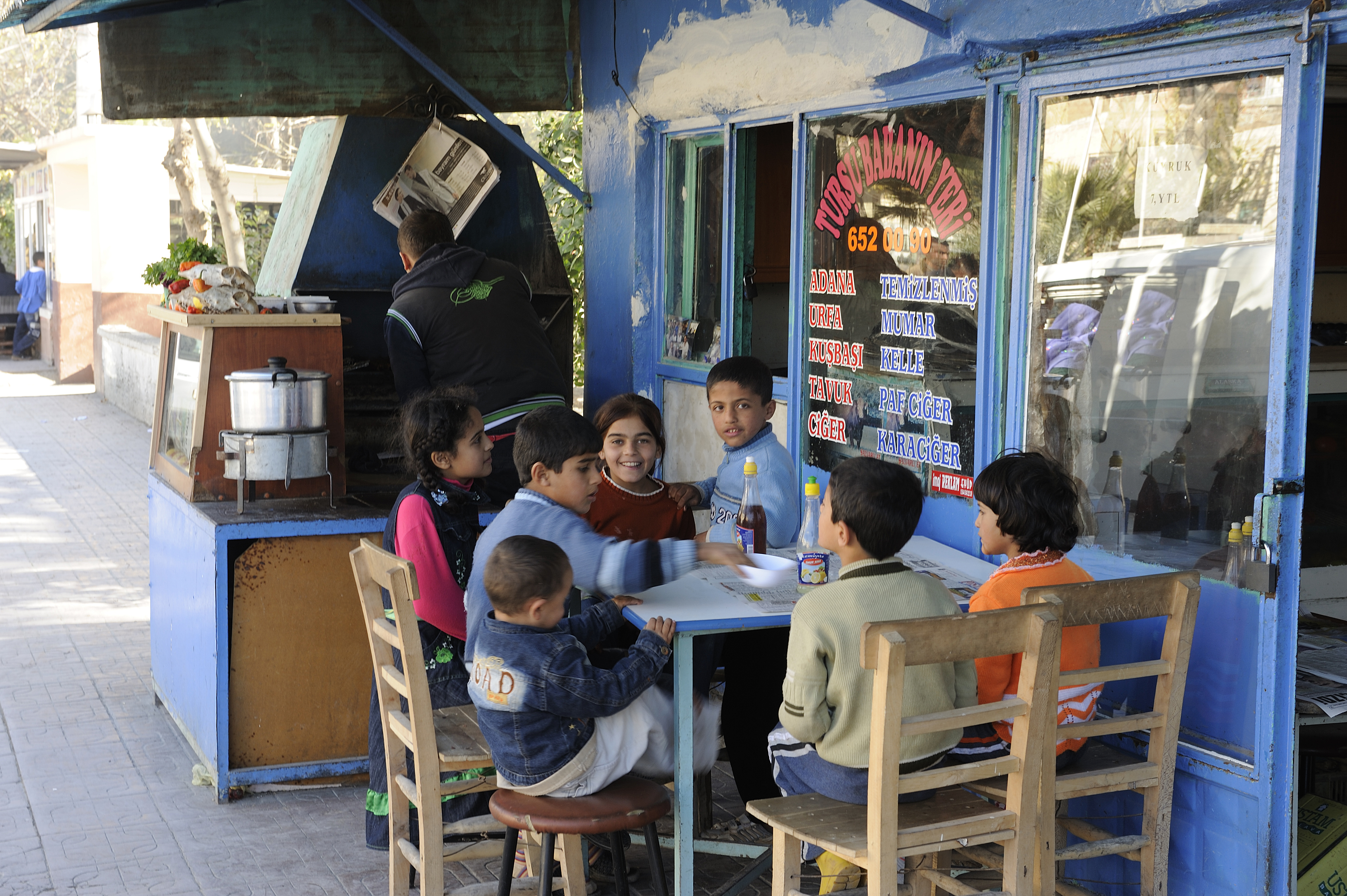

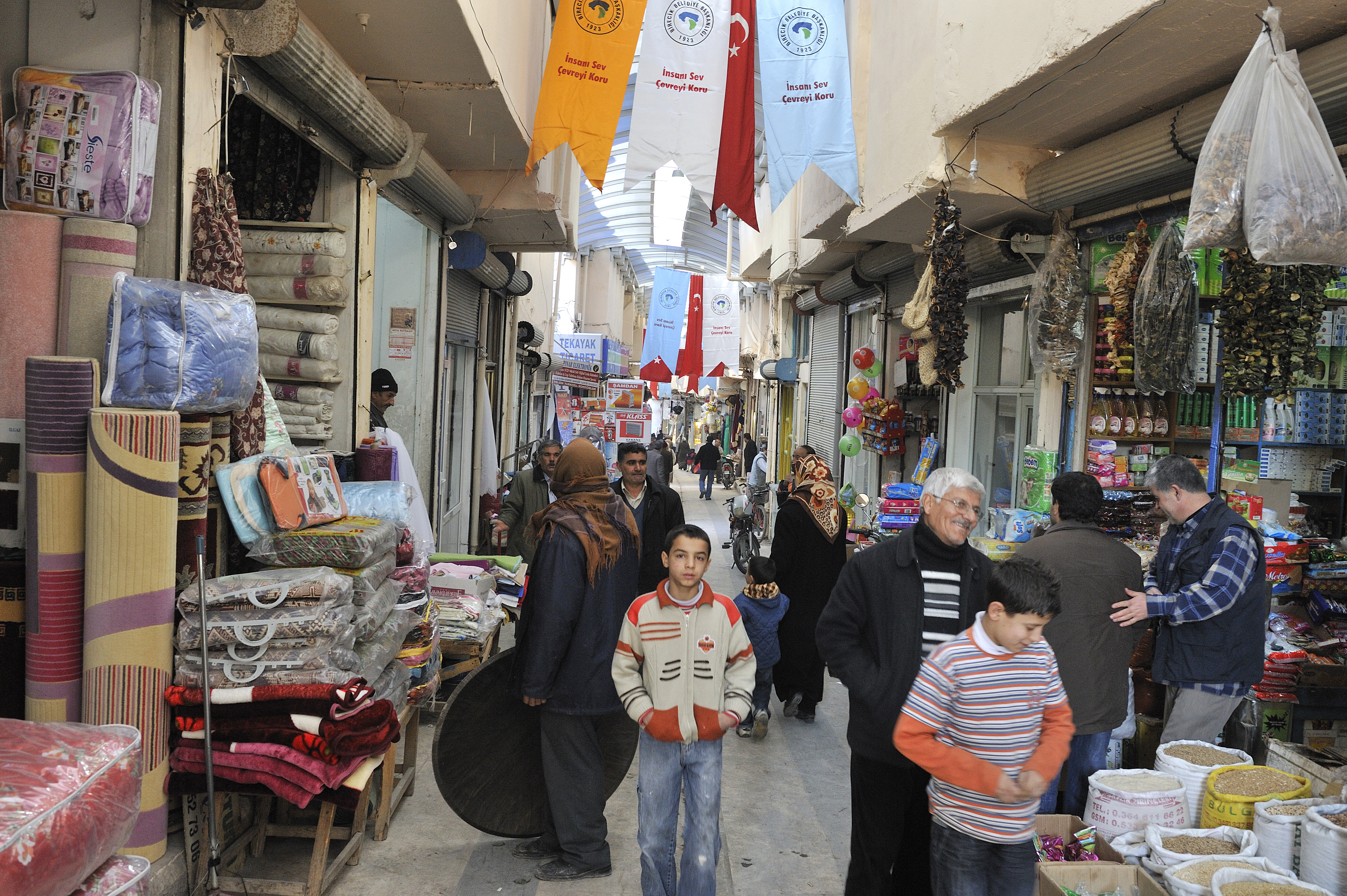

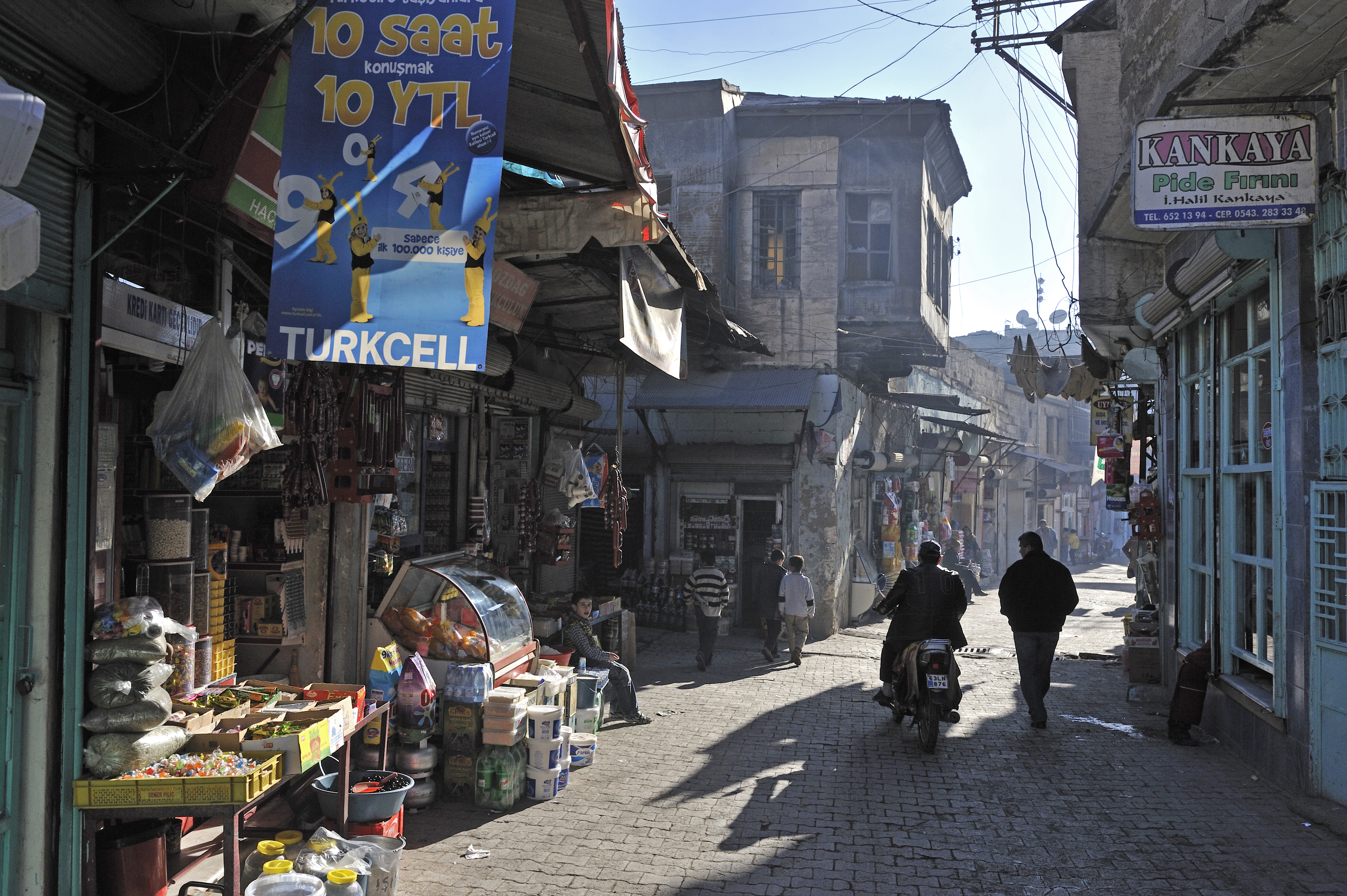

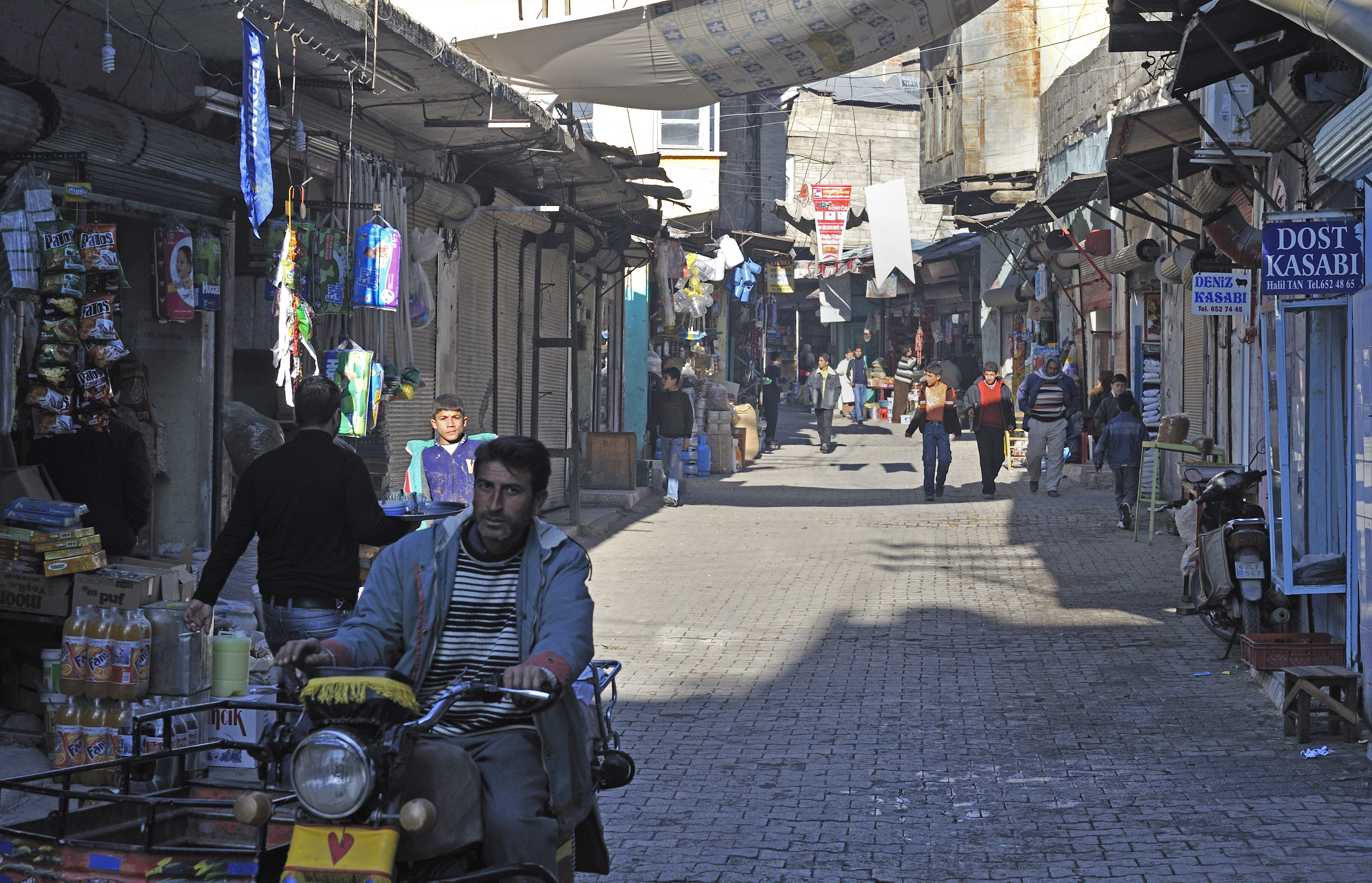

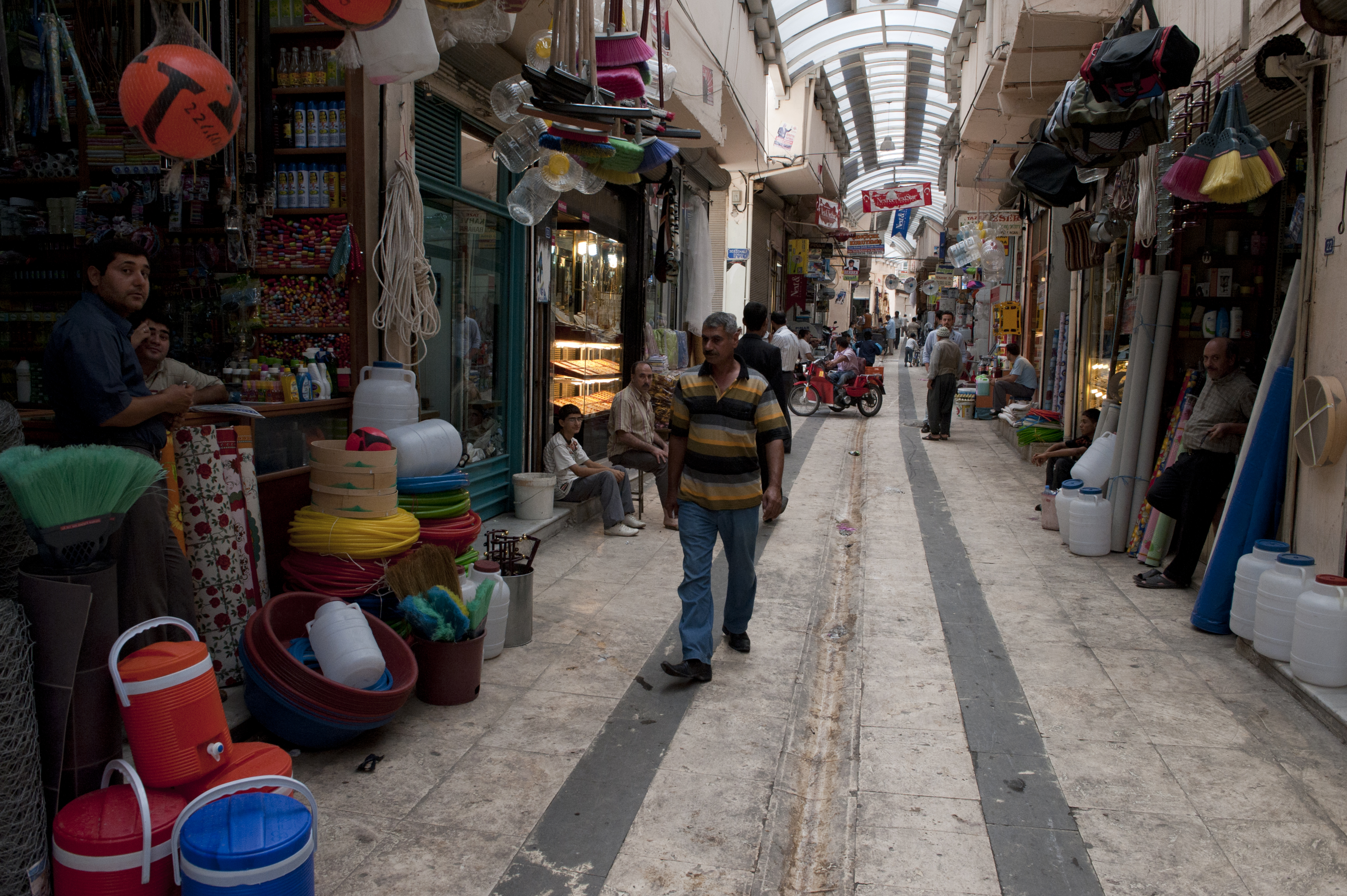

== See also ==
- Birecik Bridge
- Birecik Dam
- Kurds in Turkey
