= Hassuna culture =

Late Neolithic archaeological culture of Mesopotamia

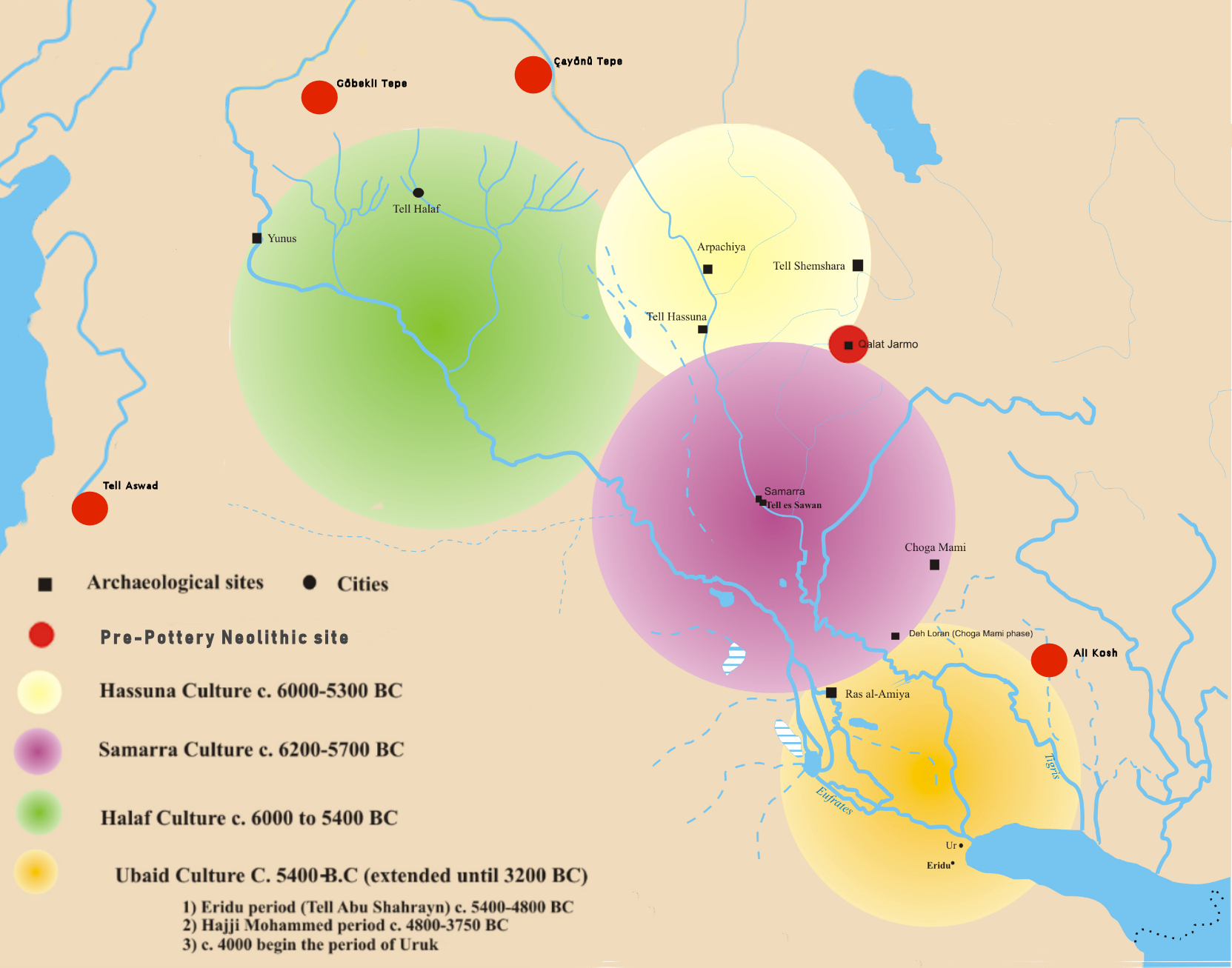
- Hassuna culture (in yellow), next to Samarra, Halaf and Ubaid cultures.
- Geographical range: Mesopotamia
- Period: Neolithic
- Dates: circa 6000 BC
- Type site: Tell Hassuna
- Major sites: Tell Shemshara
- Preceded by: Pre-Pottery Neolithic B, Yarmukian culture, Halaf culture
- Followed by: Ubaid period

Map of Iraq showing important sites that were occupied by the Hassuna culture (clickable map)

The Hassuna culture is a Neolithic archaeological culture in northern Mesopotamia dating to the early sixth millennium BC. It is named after the type site of Tell Hassuna in Iraq. Other sites where Hassuna material has been found include Tell Shemshara.

== Description ==
By around 6000 BC people had moved into the foothills (piedmont) of northernmost Mesopotamia where there was enough rainfall to allow for "dry" agriculture in some places. These were the first farmers in northernmost Mesopotamia. They made Hassuna-style pottery (cream slip with reddish paint in linear designs). Hassuna people lived in small villages or hamlets ranging 2–8 acres (0.81–3.24 ha).

At Tell Hassuna, adobe dwellings built around open central courts with fine painted pottery replace earlier levels with crude pottery. Hand axes, sickles, grinding stones, bins, baking ovens, and numerous bones of domesticated animals reflect settled agricultural life. Female figurines have been related to worship and jar burials within which food was placed related to belief in afterlife. The relationship of Hassuna pottery to that of Jericho suggests that village culture was becoming widespread.

== Pre-Proto-Hassuna ==
More recently, the concept of a very early 'Pre-Proto-Hassuna' pottery tradition has been introduced by some scholars. This has been prompted by more recent discoveries of still earlier pottery traditions. Pre-Proto-Hassuna refers to the Late Neolithic period in Upper Mesopotamia when the ceramic containers were just being introduced. The pottery vessels were still very few in number in these early settlements. At that time, the main emphasis was on the pottery with a mineral temper, as opposed to the plant-tempered pottery which came to predominate later.

The time frame for this period was about 7000-6700 BC, and at this time stone vessels and White Ware were still being used in addition to pottery. Because of the narrow local emphasis in many pottery studies as of now, these earliest pottery traditions may be known in literature as:

- Pre-Proto-Hassuna (in Khabur, and northern Iraq)
- Initial Pottery Neolithic (in Balikh River area, for example Tell Sabi Abyad)
- Transitional (in Turkish Euphrates area; main sites are Mezraa Teleilat and Akarcay Tepe, with pottery dated to c. 6800 BC)
- Halula I (in Syrian Euphrates area; the main site is Tell Halula)
- Rouj 2a (in Northern Levant); several archaeological sites are located in the Rouj basin, Idlib, Syria).

Nevertheless, all of these nomenclatures may refer to quite similar types of pottery, depending on some specific geographic region of Upper Mesopotamia.

== Proto-Hassuna ==
This period denotes a higher use of ceramics than with the pre-proto-Hassuna period. The site of Umm Dabaghiyah (de:Umm Dabaghiyah-Sotto-Kultur), in the same area of Iraq, is believed to have the earliest pottery in this region, and is sometimes described as a 'Proto-Hassuna culture' site. Other related sites in the area are Sotto and Yarim Tepe I, having 585 recorded ceramic fragments. They were found by archaeologist A.A. Bobrinsky. Another pre-Hassuna or proto-Hassuna site in Iraq is Tell Maghzaliyah. Yet another site with proto-Hassuna pottery is Ginnig.

The time frame for this period was about 6700-6300 BC.

== Archaic Hassuna ==
‘Archaic Hassuna’ has been introduced more recently as a new period different to proto-Hassuna. This period is recorded to have a decrease in the concentration of dung in ceramic production and an increase in the use of two-layer slabs in construction, although they were used prior to this period. During this timeframe, pottery kilns start to show up in many sites. The changing patterns within pottery may also connect with an increase in cultural diffusion. The type site, Tell Hassuna, is also recorded to possess Archaic Hassuna artifacts.

The time frame for this period was about 6300-6000 BC.

== Artifacts ==
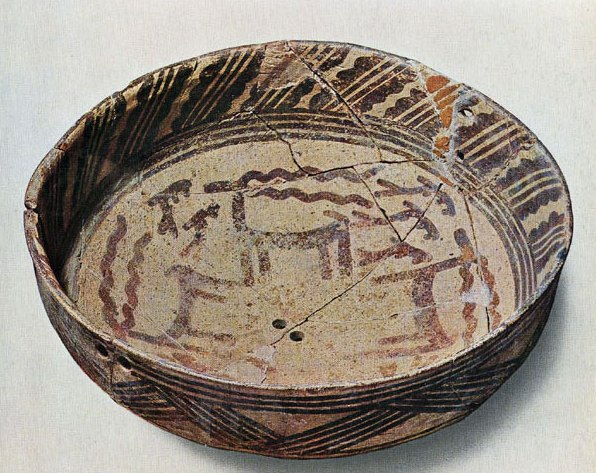
Hassuna redware bowl, circa 5500 BC

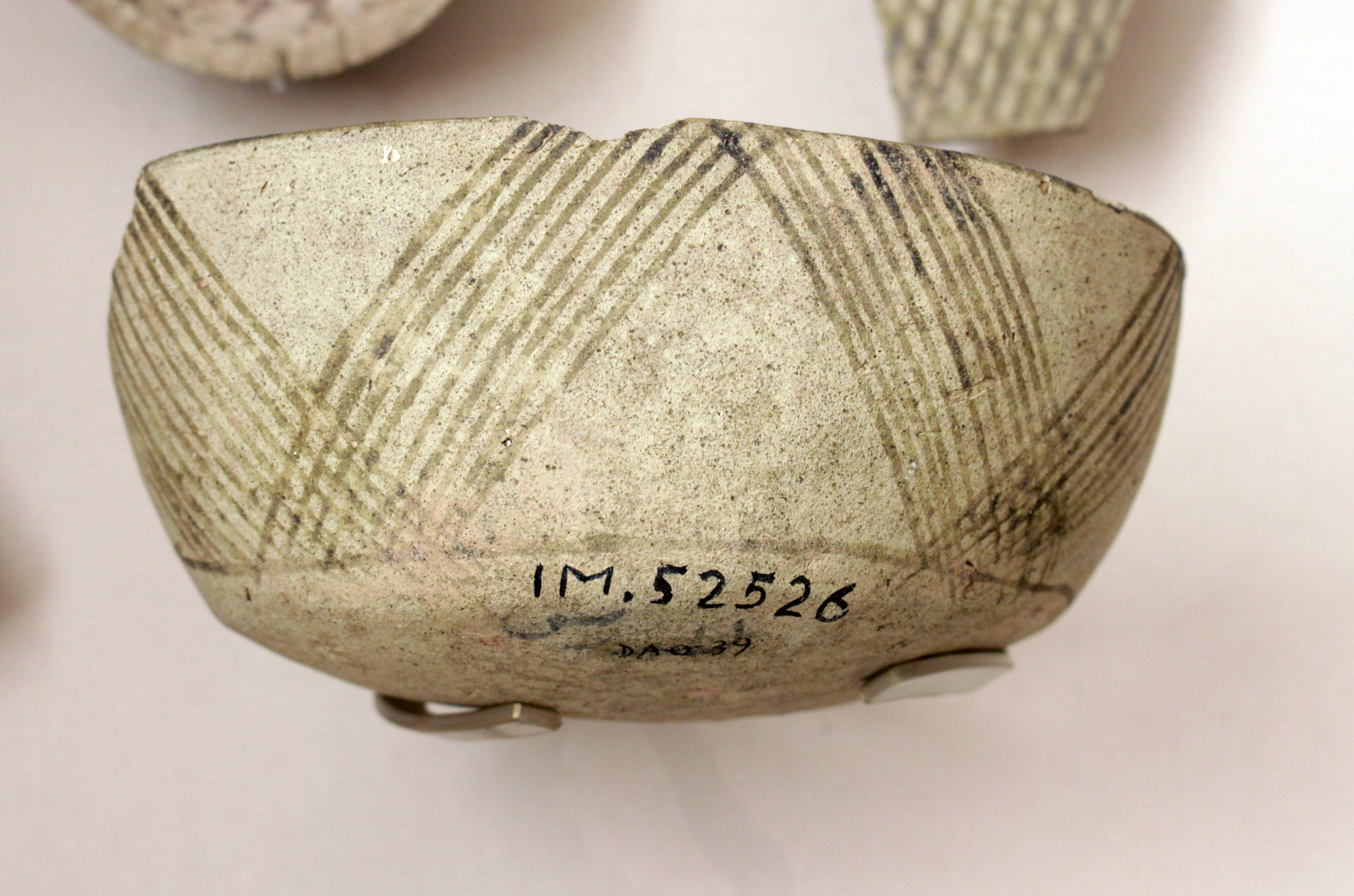
Fragment of pottery with incised and painted decor. From Tell Hassuna, 6500 - 6000 BC.

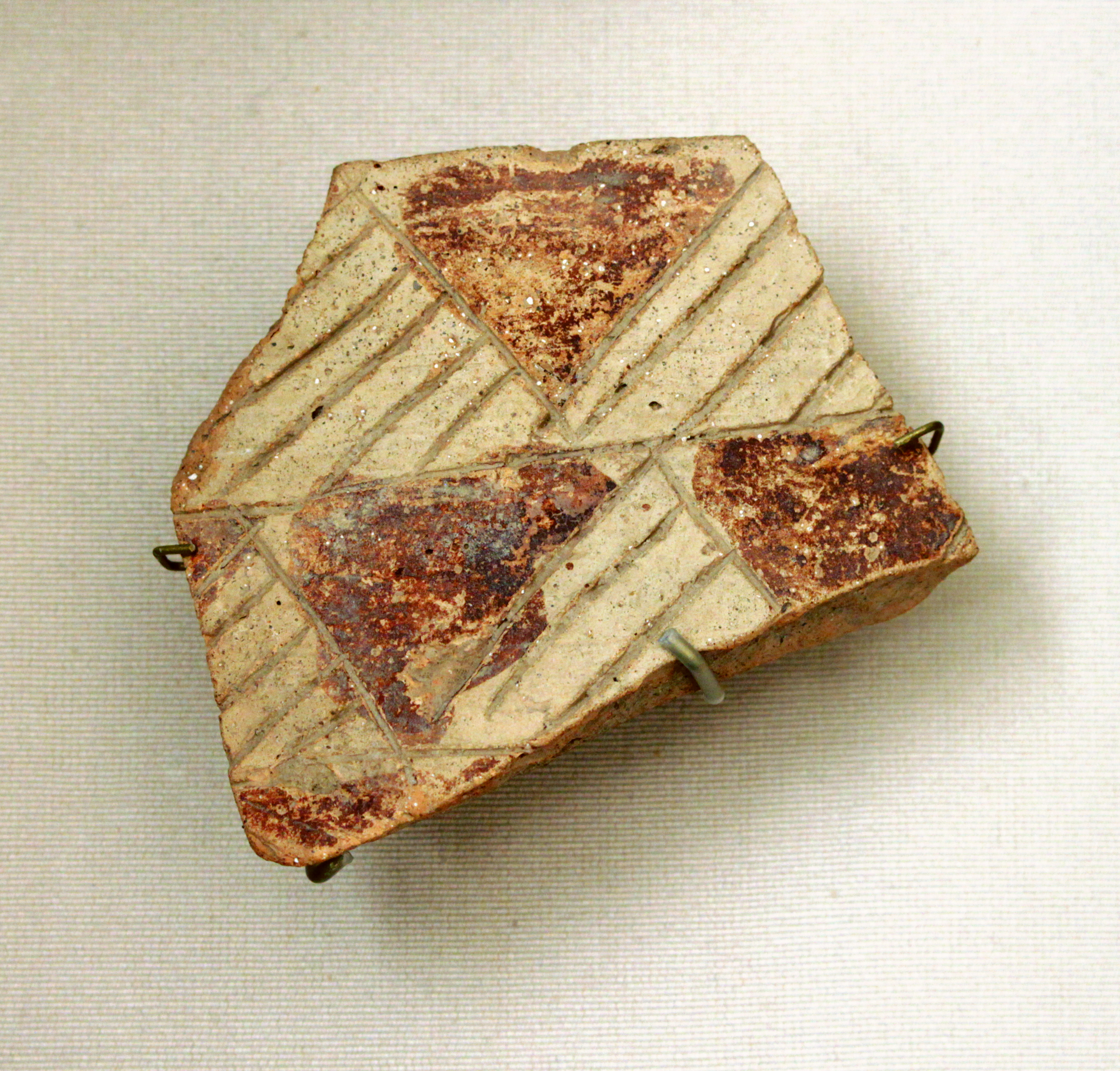
Fragment of pottery with incised and painted decor. From Tell Hassuna, 6500 - 6000 BC.

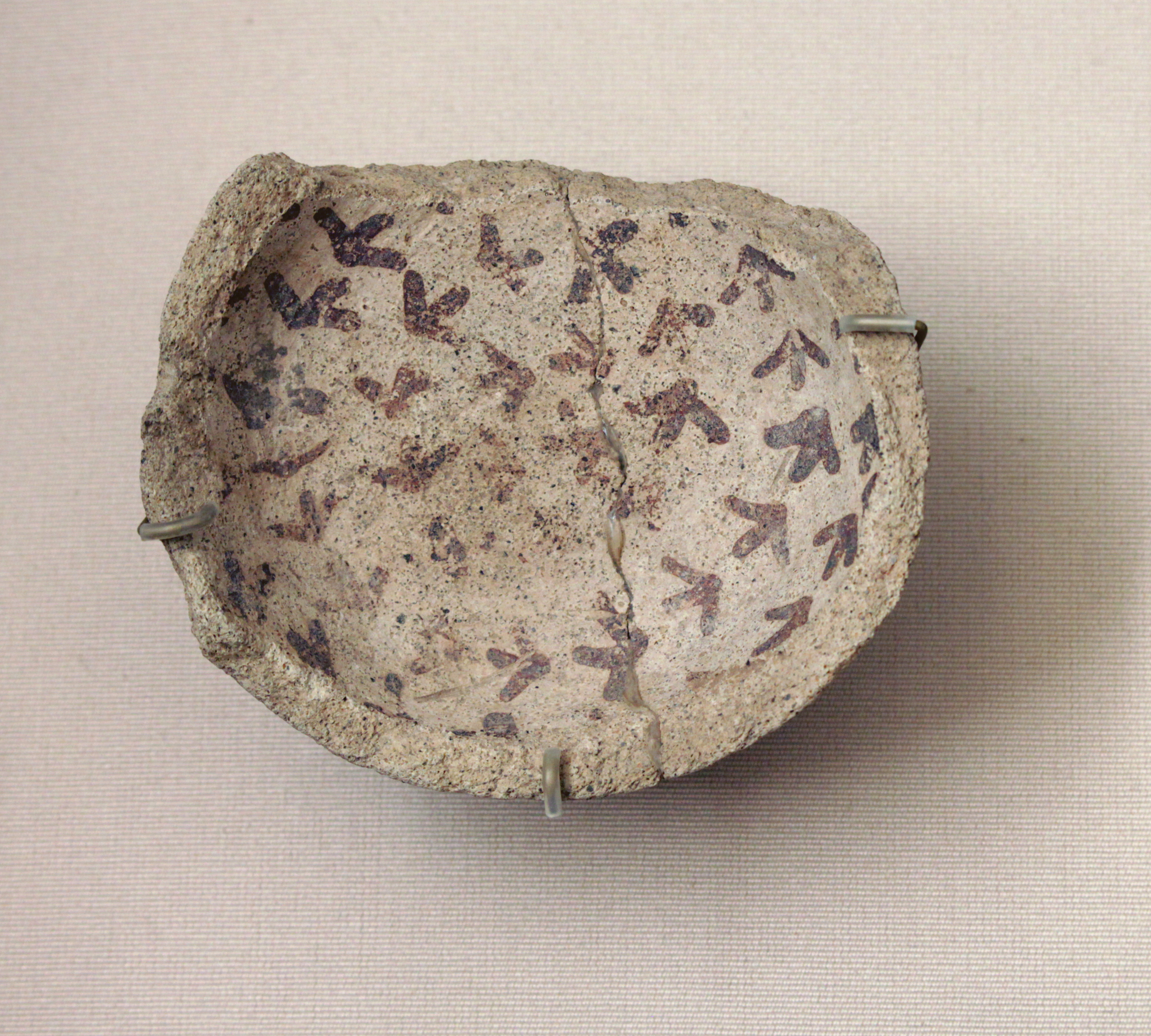
Fragment of pottery with incised and painted decor. From Tell Hassuna, 6500 - 6000 BC.

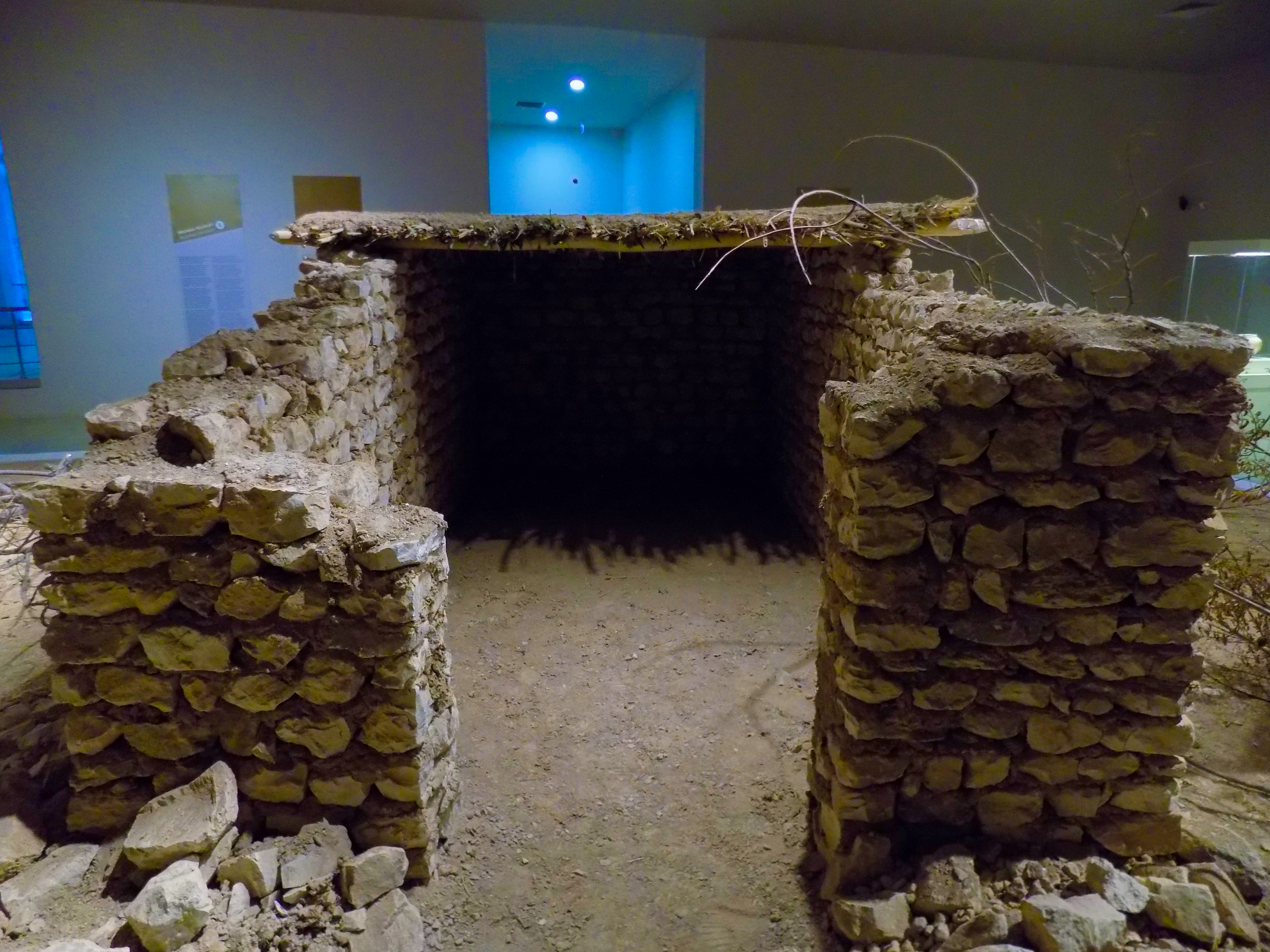
Reconstitution of Neolithic dwelling in northern Mesopotamia (Akarcay Tepe II)

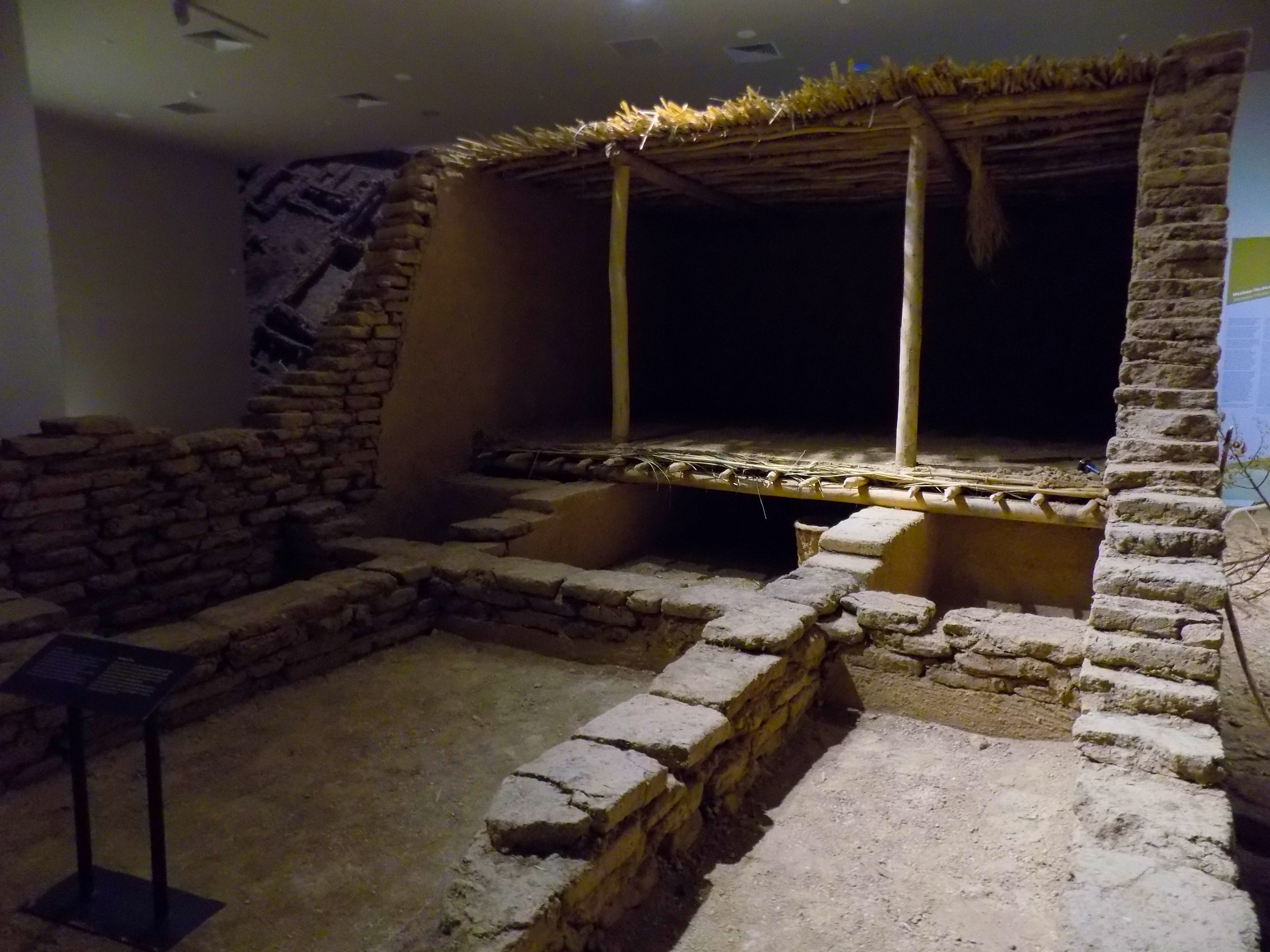
Reconstitution of Neolithic dwelling in northern Mesopotamia (Akarcay Tepe II)

== See also ==
- Samarra culture
- Levantine pottery
- Halaf culture
