= Birecik Dam Cemetery =

Bronze Age cemetery in Gaziantep region, Turkey

The Birecik Dam Cemetery is an Early Bronze Age cemetery in the Gaziantep region in southeastern Turkey. This cemetery was used extensively for a very short period of time at the beginning of the third millennium BC.

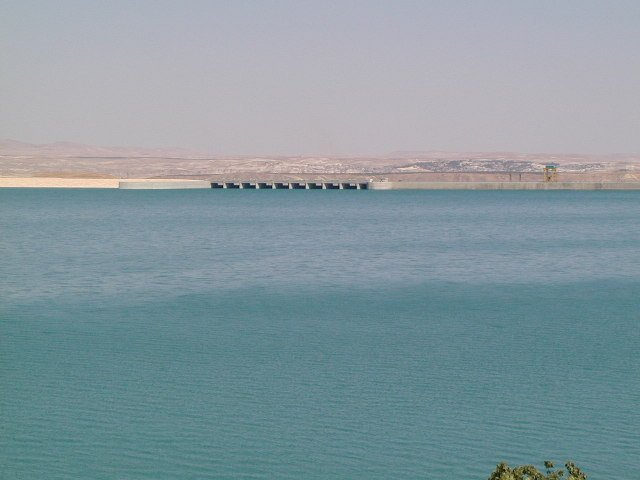
Picture of the Birecik Dam

== Location and site description ==
This three hectare cemetery is located several hundred meters from the Birecik Dam on the Euphrates River and is approximately 25 kilometers north of the ancient site of Carchemish. More than 300 graves were dug into the subsurface clay bed between 3100-2600 BC (Early Bronze IB-II), and despite the large size of this cemetery no attached settlement has been found.

== Summary of excavation ==
The Birecik Dam Cemetery was discovered during the building of the Birecik Dam as part of the GAP project, and it was subsequently excavated during two field seasons in 1997 and 1998 by archaeologists associated with the Gaziantep Museum. 312 burials were excavated in a 300 x 200 meter area during this time, though it is thought that many more graves were destroyed by the clay mining prior to the official excavations. The burials that were excavated consisted predominantly of cist graves, though there were also a small number of cooking pot and storage jar burials. The cist burials were oriented NW-SW and most had similar dimensions. Between the graves were a number of shallow depressions and pits that were filled with various materials (such as food remains) that are thought to have been part of the burial ceremony.

== Artifacts ==
Burials in this cemetery frequently included grave goods. These items consisted of: ceramic vessels, metal objects, frit and talc beads, several examples of terracotta figurines, two cylinder seals made of limestone and carnelian, a flint blade and fifteen painted cups in the Ninevite 5 style of northeastern Syria. Ceramics were by far the most frequently item found in these burials with over 5,000 vessels found between the 312 excavated burials, and an individual tomb could contain up to 150 vessels. Due to damp soil conditions and the leaching of salt through the soil, the human remains were in very poor condition when compared to the ceramic, stone and metal objects

In these burials, numerous similarities have been found with those at the contemporary site of Arslantepe, also in Turkey, to the northeast of Birecik.

The similarities are not restricted purely to the structure, but also the type of furnishings in which metal objects predominate, especially numerous weapons and spearheads. One striking aspect, which is wholly similar to Arslantepe, is the way in which the metal spearheads are arranged, generally along the northern and southern sides of the tomb, but always along the internal sides of the cist.
