= Tell Maghzaliyah =

- Magzalia, Tell Magzalia
- Location within Iraq Location within Near East
- 36°23′N 42°26′E
- Type: tell, archaeological site
- Periods: Pre-Pottery Neolithic B
- Location: Nineveh Governorate, Iraq

Site notes
- Excavation dates: 1977–1980
- Archaeologists: Nikolay Bader

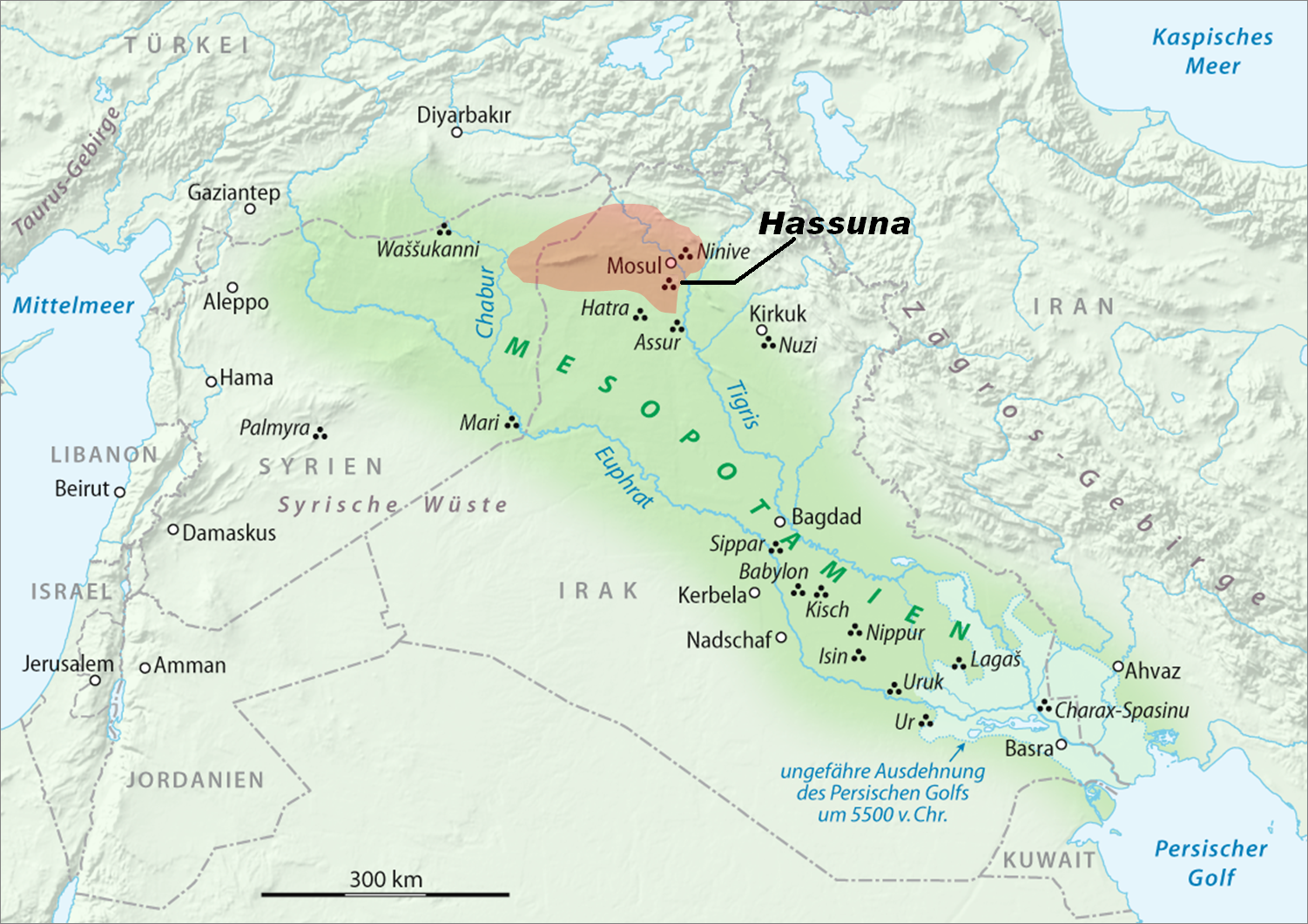
The spread of the Hassuna culture in the Near East

Tell Maghzaliyah (Tell Maghzalia), in Nineveh Governorate, Iraq, is a prehistoric fortified aceramic Mesolithic and Neolithic site located approximately 7.5 km northwest of Yarim Tepe, with which it shows some similarities. It is situated near the Abra River, a tributary of the Habur River, which eventually drains into the Euphrates River. Tell Maghzaliyah shows the development of pre-Hassuna culture. There are also numerous connections to the Jarmo culture going back to 7000 BCE.

== Archaeology ==
The site is approximately 4500 square meters in area, and the depth of deposit is approximately 8 meters. It was excavated during 12 seasons between 1969 and 1980 on the Sinjar Plain, by a Soviet team from the Institute of Archaeology, Academy of Sciences led by R. M. Munchaev and N. Ya. Merpert with N.O. Bader.

The original village housed approximately 150 people. It was more suited to hunting and gathering, than to long-standing agriculture. Archeological evidence includes flint flakes and debitage, along with evidence of semi-permanent settlement, including houses and utilitarian structures. Permanent settlement remains indicate pisé walls and stone foundations. The clay used for construction was apparently imported from other locations, as the primary natural stratigraphy is limestone loam. In its final phase the site was circled by a wall with massive stone facing.

The excavators estimated a total of 15 building levels at the site, each with an average thickness of 50–60 cm. The assemblage suggests a tightly packed settlement, occupied continuously over its existence.

== Early metallurgy ==
A hammered ‘awl’ (or a chisel) made from native copper (i.e. not smelted) was found on the floor of one of the houses.

Other early sites with metal are also Ali Kosh in lowland Iran, and Tol-e Nurabad and Tepe Sialk in the Iranian Zagros Mountains. Also in the Iranian Zagros, near Marvdasht, are located the sites of Tall-i Mushki, and Tall-i Jari showing evidence of early metallurgy utilizing native copper. All these settlements date to the late 7th/early 6th millennia BC.

== See also ==
- Cities of the ancient Near East
