= Tell Hassuna =

Archaeological type site

- Location within Iraq
- 36°27′50.4000″N 42°57′48.6000″E
- Type: tell
- Location: Nineveh Province, Iraq
- Region: Mesopotamia

Site notes
- Material: mud-brick
- Height: 7 m (23 ft)
- Length: 200 m (660 ft)
- Width: 150 m (490 ft)
- Excavation dates: 1943, 1944
- Archaeologists: S. Lloyd

Tell Hassuna is a tell, or settlement mound, in the Nineveh Province (Iraq), about 35km south-west of Nineveh. It is the type site for the Hassuna culture (early sixth millennium BCE).

== History of archaeological research ==
Tell Hassuna was found in 1942 by Fuad Safar, and excavated in 1943 and 1944 by a team from the Iraqi Directorate General of Antiquities led by Seton Lloyd. Excavations revealed that there was once an advanced village culture that was spread throughout northern Mesopotamia.

At Hassuna, six different layers of houses were uncovered, revealing various vessels and pottery that date ca. 5600-5350 BCE, with each layer becoming more substantial. Similar vessels were found throughout the Middle East, showing that there was an extensive trade network that was present as early as the 6th Millennium BCE.

== Tell Hassuna and its environment ==
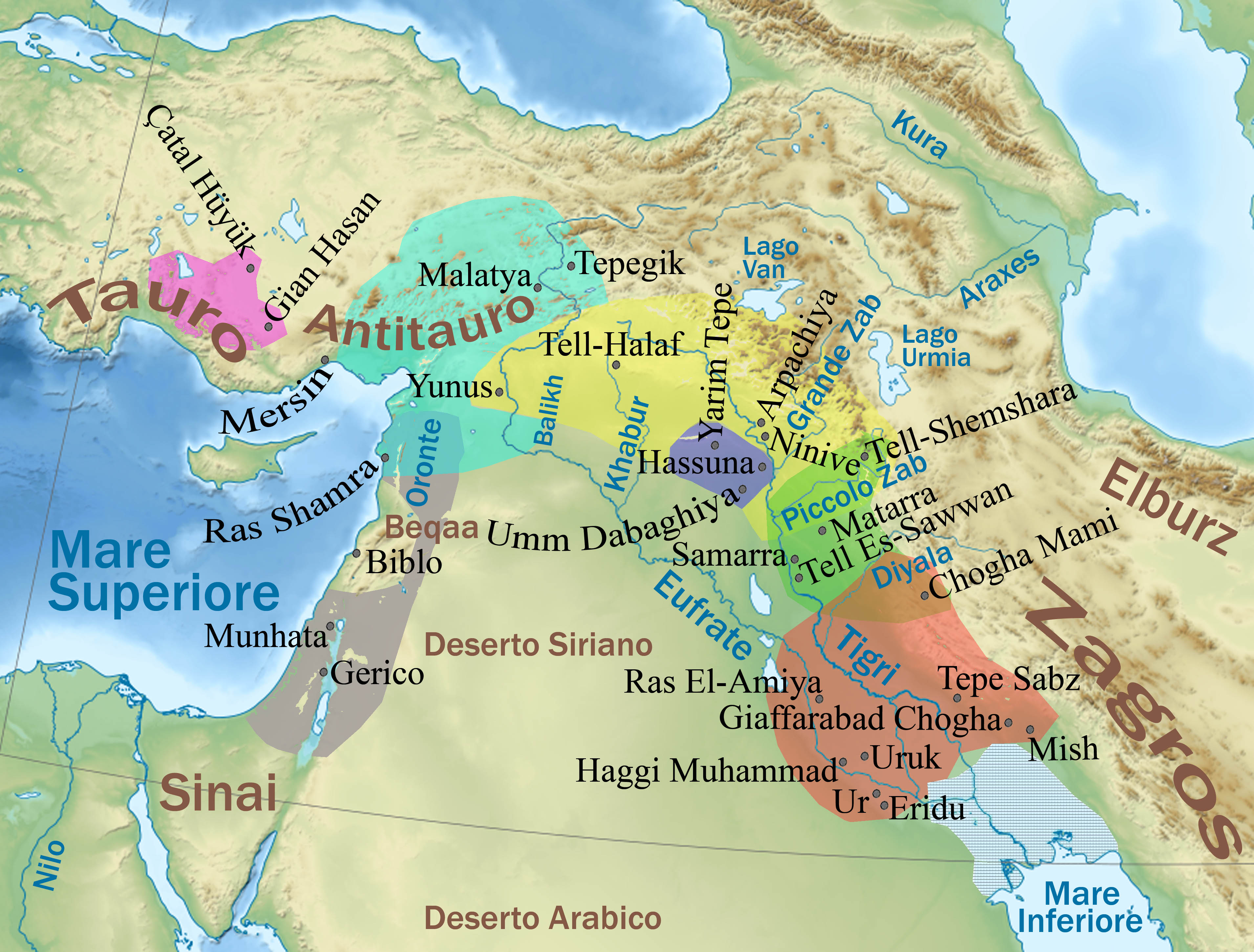
Ancient Near East in 5200-4500 BC (Middle Halaf period) showing Hassuna culture location

Tell Hassuna is located approximately 35 kilometres (22 mi) southwest of modern Mosul, along the west bank of the Tigris River. It is a small site, roughly 200 by 150 metres (660 ft × 490 ft) and about 7 metres (23 ft) high. Hassuna was one of the earliest cultures in Northern Mesopotamia. Before this time, Southern Mesopotamia was considered the cradle of civilization. When settlements began forming in the north, such as Hassuna, Jarmo, Samarra, and Tell Halaf, the north became an important region.

The architecture at Hassuna was built of packed mud, with the width varying from 20 to 50 centimeters. The mud-brick technique may perhaps have been developed in Southern Mesopotamia, where mud-bricks were common in the first half of the 6th millennium B.C.

== Occupation history ==
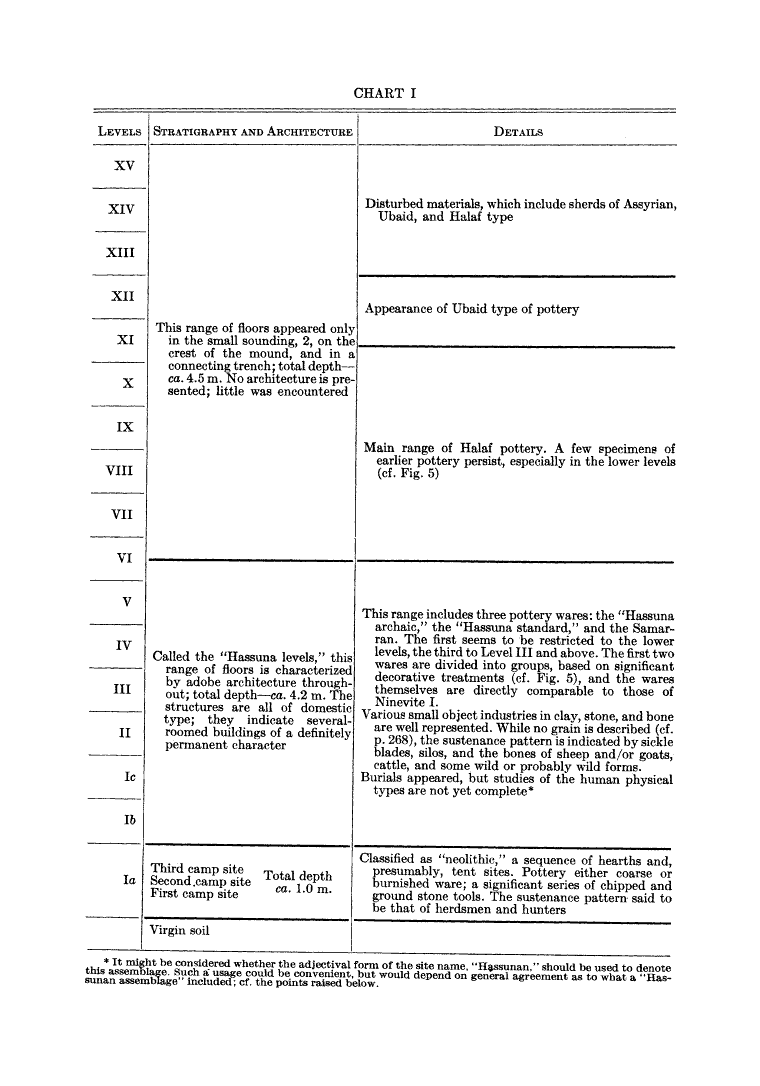
Hassuna Pottery Levels

Around 6,000 B.C., people began moving to the foothills of northern Mesopotamia and practicing methods of dry agriculture. These people were the first known farmers, and Hassuna became one of the most ancient centers for the principal forms of producing economies, such as the cultivation of soil and raising livestock. Evidence of this is shown in the oldest layers of Hassuna. The occupants of Hassuna also led the way in improving agriculture, settling the river valleys, the beginning of irrigation, and progress in all branches of production and culture.

Around 6,000 B.C., at Tell Hassuna, adobe dwellings were built around open central courts; fine painted pottery was replacing the crude pottery of the earlier levels.

Hand axes, sickles, grinding stones, bins, baking ovens, and numerous bones of domesticated animals reflect settled agricultural life. Stone tools found at Tell Hassuna do not seem to be as advanced as tools found at other sites of the Hassuna culture, such as Jarmo, and were typically made of flint and obsidian.

Female figurines were also used in relation to worship and jar burials, within which food was placed due to belief in the afterlife.

== Pottery ==
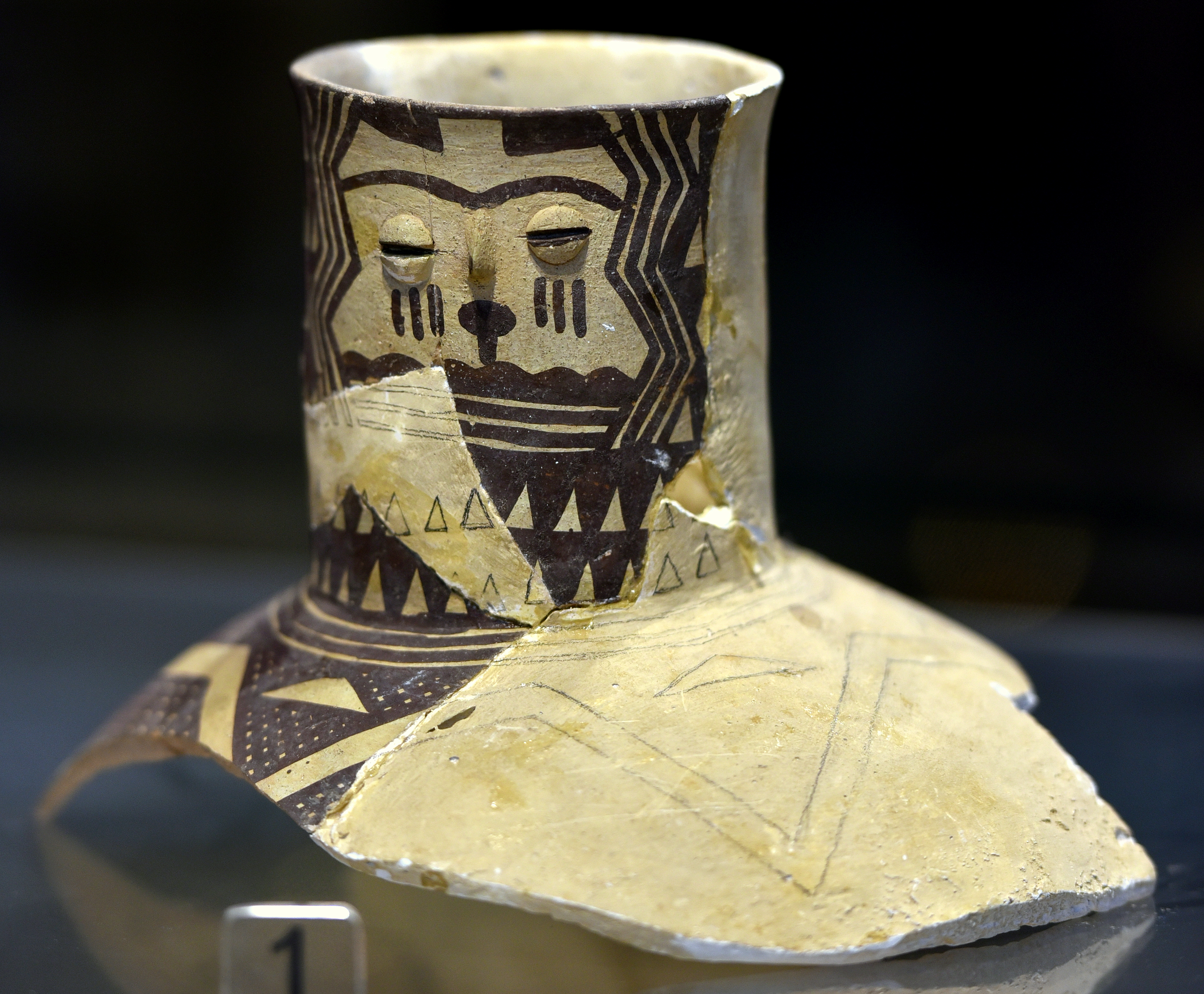
Neck of a painted jar from Tell Hassuna, Iraq, belonging to Samarra culture. 5000 BCE. Iraq Museum

Pottery found at Hassuna can be divided into three different categories: Hassuna Archaic, Hassuna Standard, and Samarran. These also include painted, incised, and painted-incised ware.

=== Samarra Painted Fine Ware ===
The decoration of the Samarra Painted Fine Ware is always monochrome, but it seems as if three types of paint have been used: an ivory black, a dark violet brown, and a medium chocolate brown. Circumstances of firing and variations in the concentration of the paint have caused color changes, so that, for example, an oxidizing firing of vessels painted with ivory black has produced an Indian red color.

In general, the designs of the Samarra Painted Fine Ware are carefully painted. Occasionally, however, parallel lines approach or diverge slightly, and the thickness of some lines varies, apparently due to the use of a soft painting brush. The outside rim motifs are spaced and limited by groups of horizontal lines.

== See also ==
- Cities of the ancient Near East
