= Çiçekalan =

- Neighbourhood
- Location in Turkey Çiçekalan (Şanlıurfa)
- Coordinates: 36.8808°N 38.0581°E
- Country: Turkey
- Province: Şanlıurfa
- District: Birecik
- Population (2022): 238
- Time zone: UTC+3 (TRT)

Çiçekalan is a neighbourhood of the municipality and district of Birecik, Şanlıurfa Province, Turkey. Its population is 238 (2022). It is located on the east bank of the Euphrates, very close to the Syrian border.

== Archaeology ==
There are four archaeological mounds near the village: Değirmen Höyük, Küçük Kale Tepe, Camuz Tepe, and Tiladir Tepe.

- Değirmen Höyük has a surface area of 180x120 m and reaches a height of 20 m tall. First identified by G. Algaze et al. in 1994, it is estimated to be from the Early Bronze Age.
- Küçük Kale Tepe is a small mound dated to the Hellenistic and Roman periods.
- Camuz Tepe has been dated to the early-Middle Paleolithic, the Iron Age, and the Roman period.
- Tiladir Tepe is by far the largest, with a total surface area of 610x200 m and a height of 5 m. It has been dated to the Pottery Neolithic, late Chalcolithic, Bronze Age, Iron Age, and Byzantine periods.

== See also ==
- Karkamış Bridge
