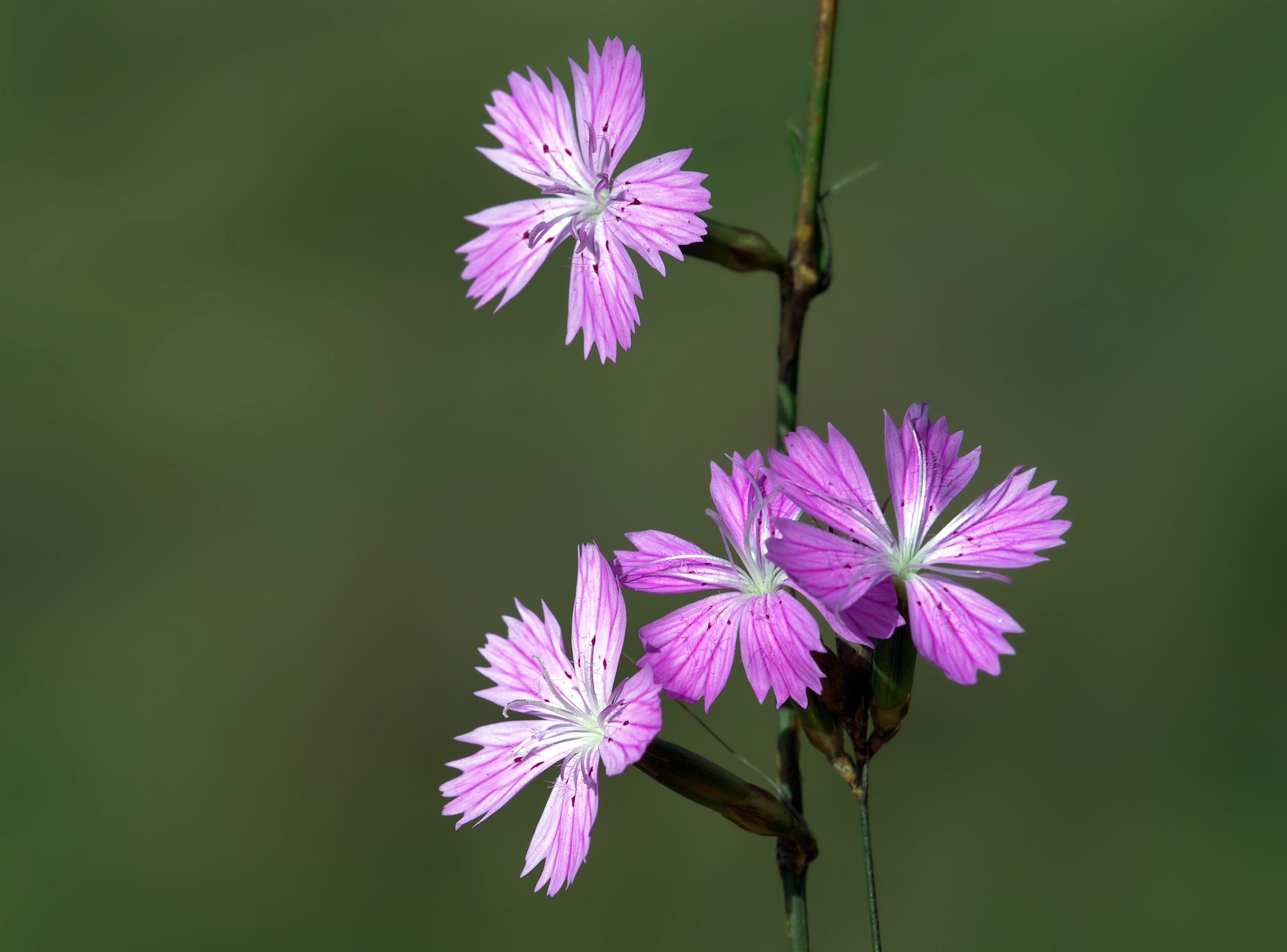

Scientific classification
- Kingdom: Plantae
- Clade: Embryophytes
- Clade: Tracheophytes
- Clade: Spermatophytes
- Clade: Angiosperms
- Clade: Eudicots
- Order: Caryophyllales
- Family: Caryophyllaceae
- Genus: Dianthus
- Species: D. strictus

Binomial name
- Dianthus strictus Banks & Sol. (1794)

Subspecies and varieties
- 6; see text

= Dianthus strictus =

Wild pink

Species of plant

Dianthus strictus, known as the wild pink, is a species of flowering plant in the family Caryophyllaceae.

== Description ==
Perennial, very variable. Leaves ciliate at base and scabrous at margin. Inflorescence loose, more or less branching. Scales of calyx pale, membranous, briefly aristate. Calyx conical-cylindrical, slightly tapered at apex, greenish-white, sometimes tinged with purple. Striations often limited to the apex of teeth and to some bands below sinuses. Petals pink, lamina fan-shaped, denticulate, marked with dots which gave the plant its name.

== Flowering ==
The plant flowers any time from May–December.

== Range ==
It is native to Greece's Aegean Islands (including Crete), Turkey, Cyprus, Syria, Lebanon, the Palestine region, the Sinai Peninsula, Iraq, Iran, Saudi Arabia, and Yemen.

== Subspecies and varieties ==
Six subspecies and varieties are accepted.

- Dianthus strictus var. axilliflorus (Fenzl) Eig (synonyms D. axilliflorus Fenzl, D. bitlisianus Kotschy ex Boiss., D. multipunctatus var. axilliflorus (Fenzl) Boiss.) – southeastern Turkey, Syria, Iraq, and northwestern Iran
- Dianthus strictus subsp. multipunctatus (Ser.) Mouterde ex Greuter & Burdet (synonyms D. lineolatus Bové ex Delile and D. multipunctatus Ser.) – western Crete, East Aegean Islands, Lebanon and Syria, and Sinai Peninsula.
- Dianthus strictus subsp. strictus (synonyms D. halepensis Bornm., D. multipunctatus var. micranthus Boiss., D. multipunctatus var. subenervis Boiss., D. polycladus var. glomeratus Bornm., D. quadrilobus Boiss., D. striatellus Fenzl, D. strictus var. micranthus (Boiss.) Eig, D. strictus var. subenervis (Boiss.) Eig, D. sulcatus Boiss.) Turkey, the Levant, Iraq, and Iran
- Dianthus strictus subsp. sublaevis D.F.Chamb. – Saudi Arabia and Yemen
- Dianthus strictus subsp. troodi (Post) B.F.Osoriol & Seraphim ex Greuter & Burdet (synonyms D. multipunctatus var. troodi Post, D. strictus var. troodi (Post) S.S.Hooper) – western Cyprus
- Dianthus strictus subsp. velutinus (Boiss.) Mouterde ex Greuter & Burdet (synonyms D. multipunctatus var. velutinus Boiss., Dianthus strictus var. velutinus (Boiss.) Eig) – Israel, Syria, and northern and northeastern Iraq
