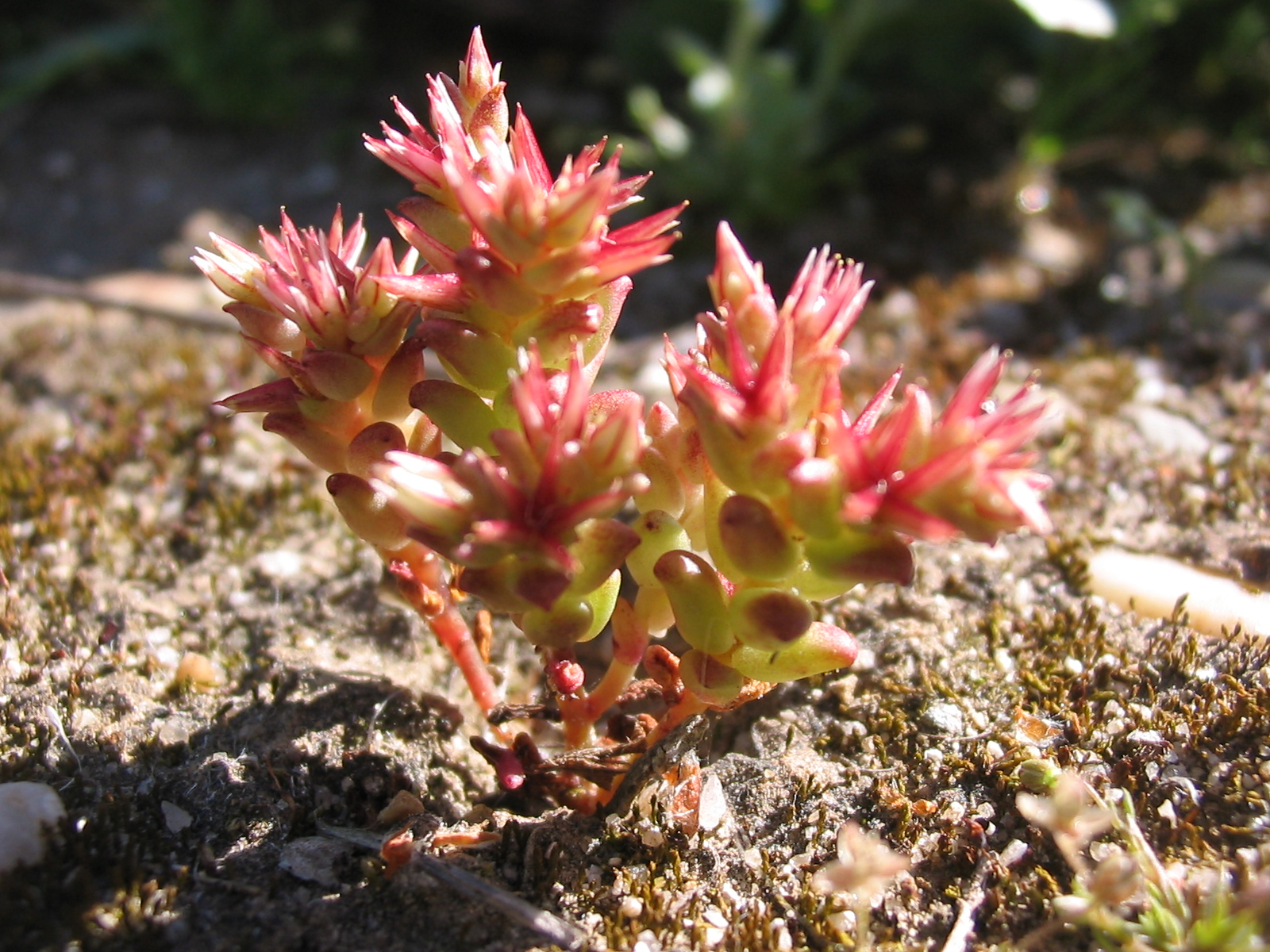

Scientific classification
- Kingdom: Plantae
- Clade: Tracheophytes
- Clade: Angiosperms
- Clade: Eudicots
- Order: Saxifragales
- Family: Crassulaceae
- Genus: Sedum
- Species: S. cespitosa

Binomial name
- Sedum cespitosa (Cav.) DC.

Synonyms
- List: Aithales cespitosa (Cav.) Webb & Berthel.; Crassula cespitosa Cav.; Procrassula cespitosa (Cav.) Fourr.; Procrassula magnolii Griseb.; Crassula diffusa Lam.; Crassula magnolii DC.; Crassula verticillaris L.; Sedum deserti-hungarici Simonk.; Sedum erythrocarpum Pau; Sedum louisii (J.Thiébaut & Gomb.) Gomb.; Sedum magnolii Bubani; Sedum melanoleucum Schltdl. ex Ledeb.; Sedum rubrum (L.) Thell.; Tillaea erecta Sauvages ex DC.; Tillaea rubra L.

= Sedum cespitosa =

Species of plant

Sedum cespitosa is a species of annual herb in the family Crassulaceae. It has a self-supporting growth form and simple, broad leaves. Individuals can grow to 3 cm.
