= Birecik Dam =

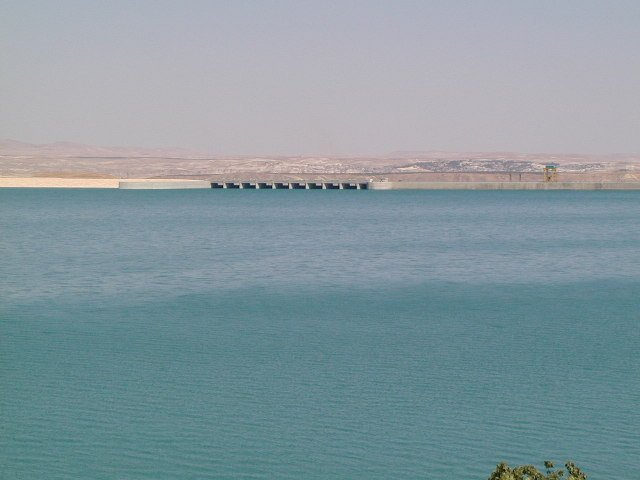

- Location within Turkey
- Interactive map of Birecik Dam
- Location: Turkey
- Coordinates: 37°03′12″N 37°53′24″E
- Opening date: 2000

Dam and spillways
- Type of dam: Gravity dam
- Impounds: Euphrates River
- Height: 62.5 m (205 ft)

Reservoir
- Creates: Reservoir
- Catchment area: 92,700 ha (358 mi^{2})

Power Station
- Commission date: 2000-2001
- Turbines: 6 × 112 MW
- Installed capacity: 672 MW
- Annual generation: 2,500 GWh

The Birecik Dam, one of the 21 dams of the Southeastern Anatolia Project of Turkey, is located on the Euphrates River 60 km (37 mi) downstream of Atatürk Dam and 8 km (5.0 mi) upstream of Birecik town 80 km (50 mi) west of Province of Şanlıurfa in the southeastern region of Turkey. It was purposed for irrigation and energy production. There is a run-of-the-river hydroelectric power plant, established in 2001, at the dam, with a power output of 672MW (six units at 112 MW each) can generate an average of 2.5 billion kWh per year. The Birecik dam is a structure consisting of a concrete gravity and clay core sandgravel fill with a height of 62.5 m (205 ft) from the foundation. It was designed by Coyne et Bellier. The total catchment area is 92,700 ha (358 sq mi). The Birecik project will be realized under the status of Build-Operate-Transfer (BOT) model.

The dam was built on top of the ruins of the ancient city of Zeugma. According to Bogumil Terminski (2015), the construction of the dam resulted in resettlement of approximately 6,000 people.

== See also ==
- List of power stations in Turkey
