= Zeugma Mosaic Museum =

Museum in Gaziantep, southern Turkey

- Zeugma Mozaik Müzesi
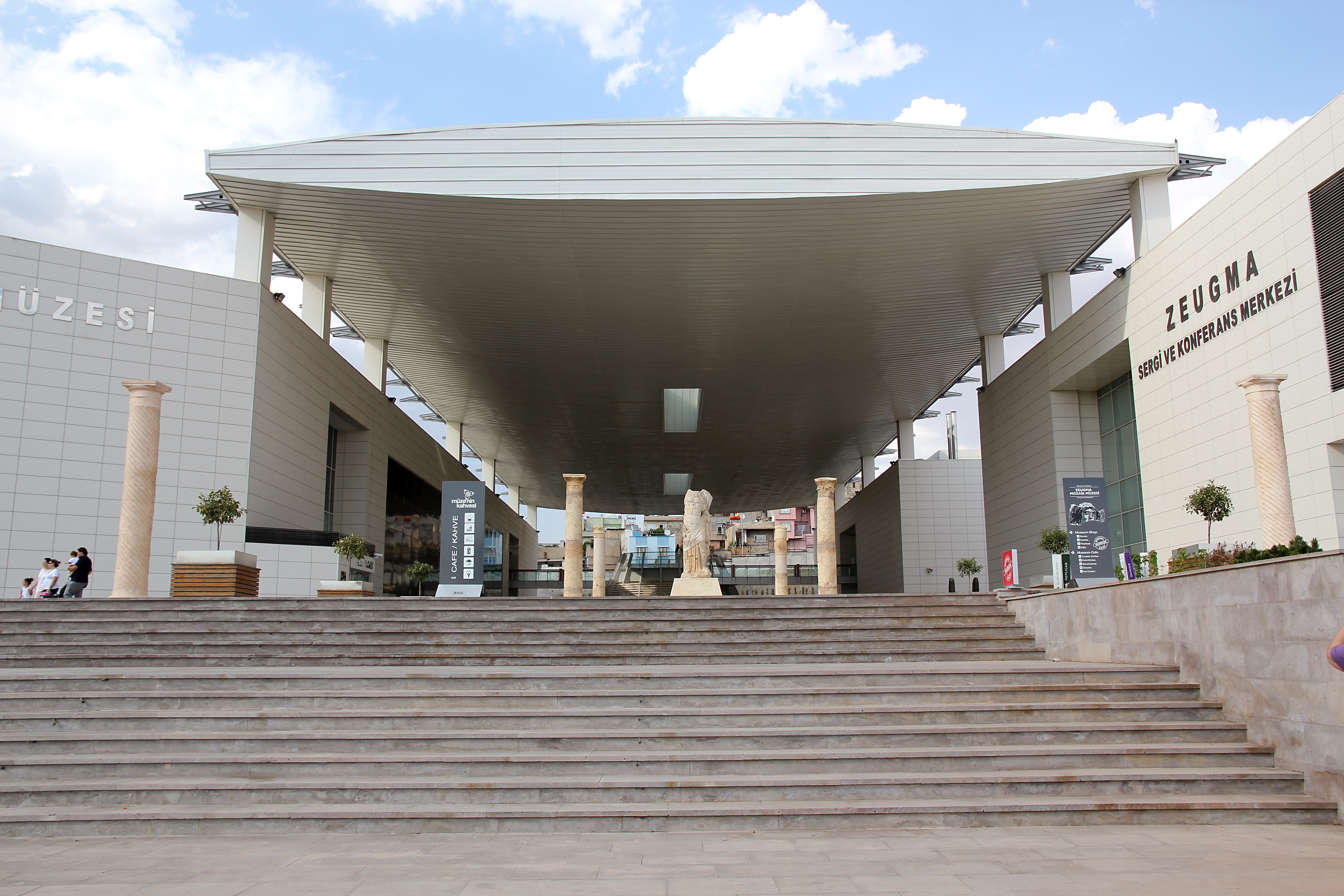
- Established: September 9, 2011
- Location: Gaziantep, Turkey
- Coordinates: 37°04′32″N 37°23′08″E
- Type: Archaeology museum

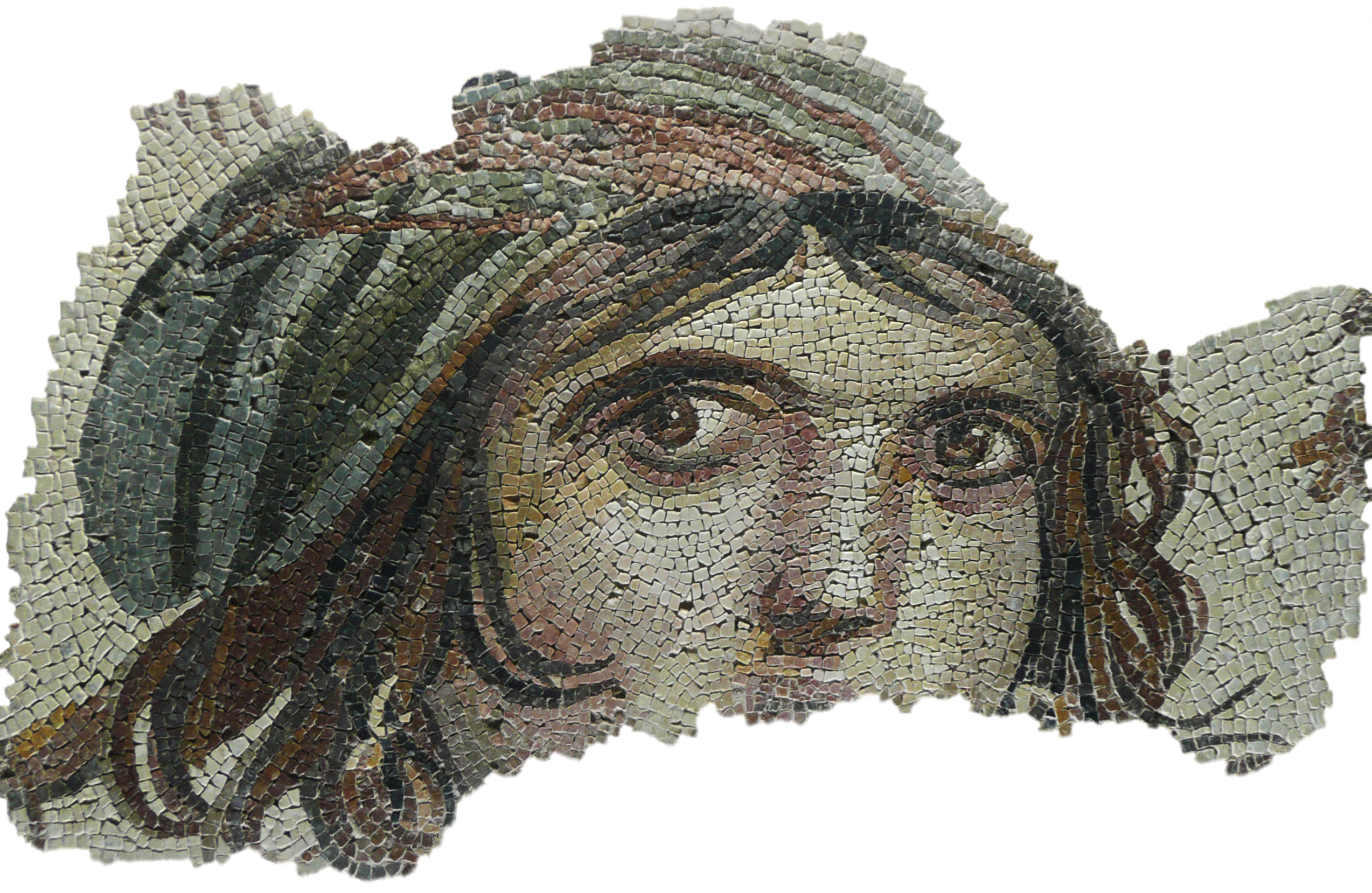
The "Gypsy Girl" is in Zeugma Mosaic Museum, displayed in a special room.

Zeugma Mosaic Museum, in the city of Gaziantep, Turkey, is the biggest mosaic museum in the world, containing 1700 m^{2} of mosaics. It opened to the public on 9 September 2011. The 30,000 m^{2} (320,000 sq ft) museum features 2,448 m^{2} (26,350 sq ft) of mosaic and replaces the Bardo National Museum in Tunis as the world's largest mosaic museum.

The museum's Hellenistic Greek and Roman mosaics are focused on Zeugma, which is said to have been founded as Seleucia by Seleucus I Nicator, founder of the Seleucid Kingdom after serving as a hetairoi military officer in the army of Alexander the Great. The treasures, including the mosaics, remained relatively unknown until 2000 when artifacts appeared in museums and when plans for new dams on the Euphrates meant that much of Zeugma would be flooded. In 2011, many of the mosaics remain covered, and teams of researchers continue to work on the project.

The museum building and its artifacts survived the M_{w} 7.8 2023 Turkey–Syria earthquake unscathed, unlike most of Gaziantep, which was heavily damaged. All of the museum staff also survived the earthquake. The museum was reopened in April 2023, two and a half months after the 2023 Turkey–Syria earthquake.

== Gallery ==
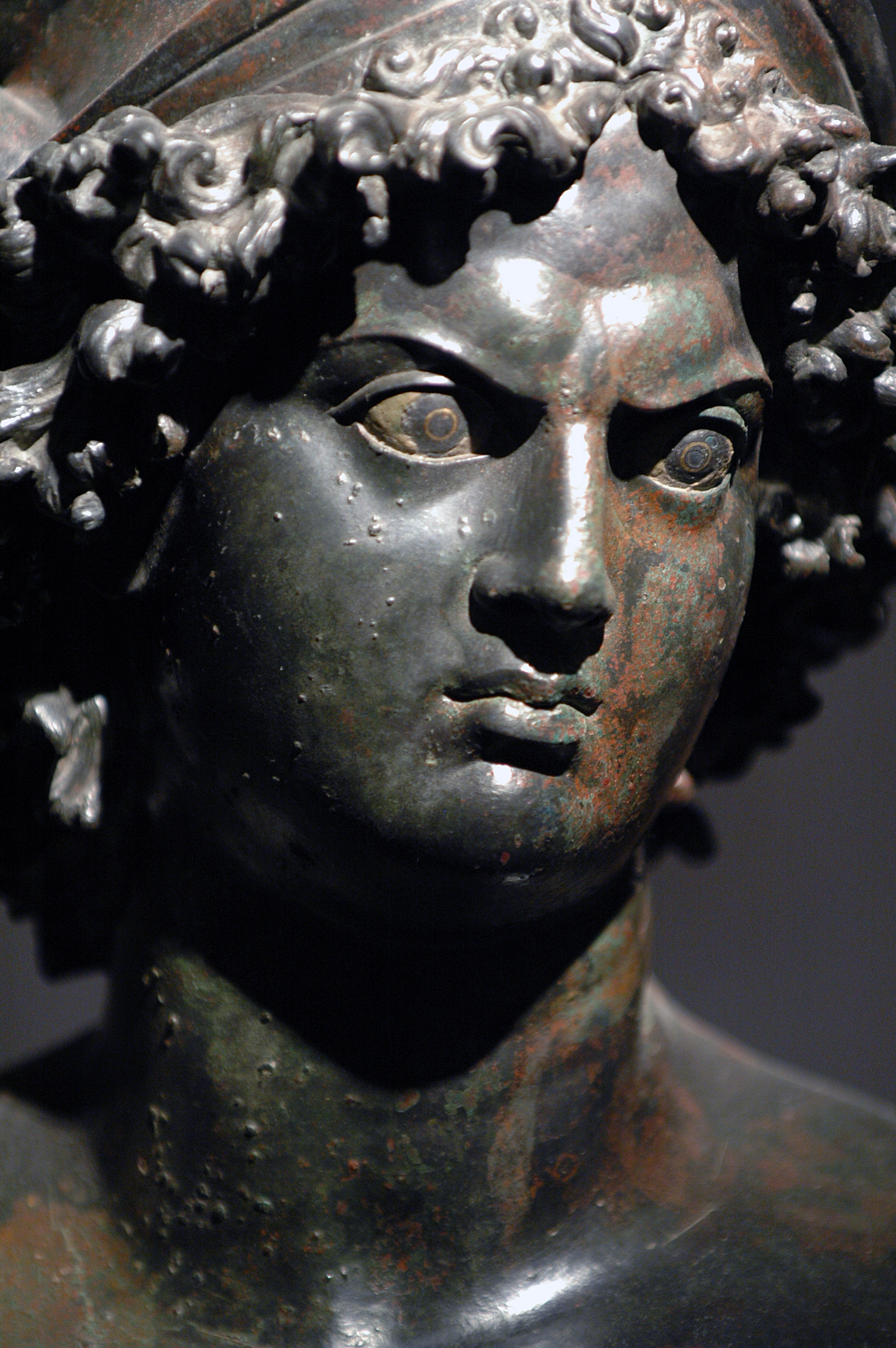
Gaziantep Zeugma Museum Mars statue

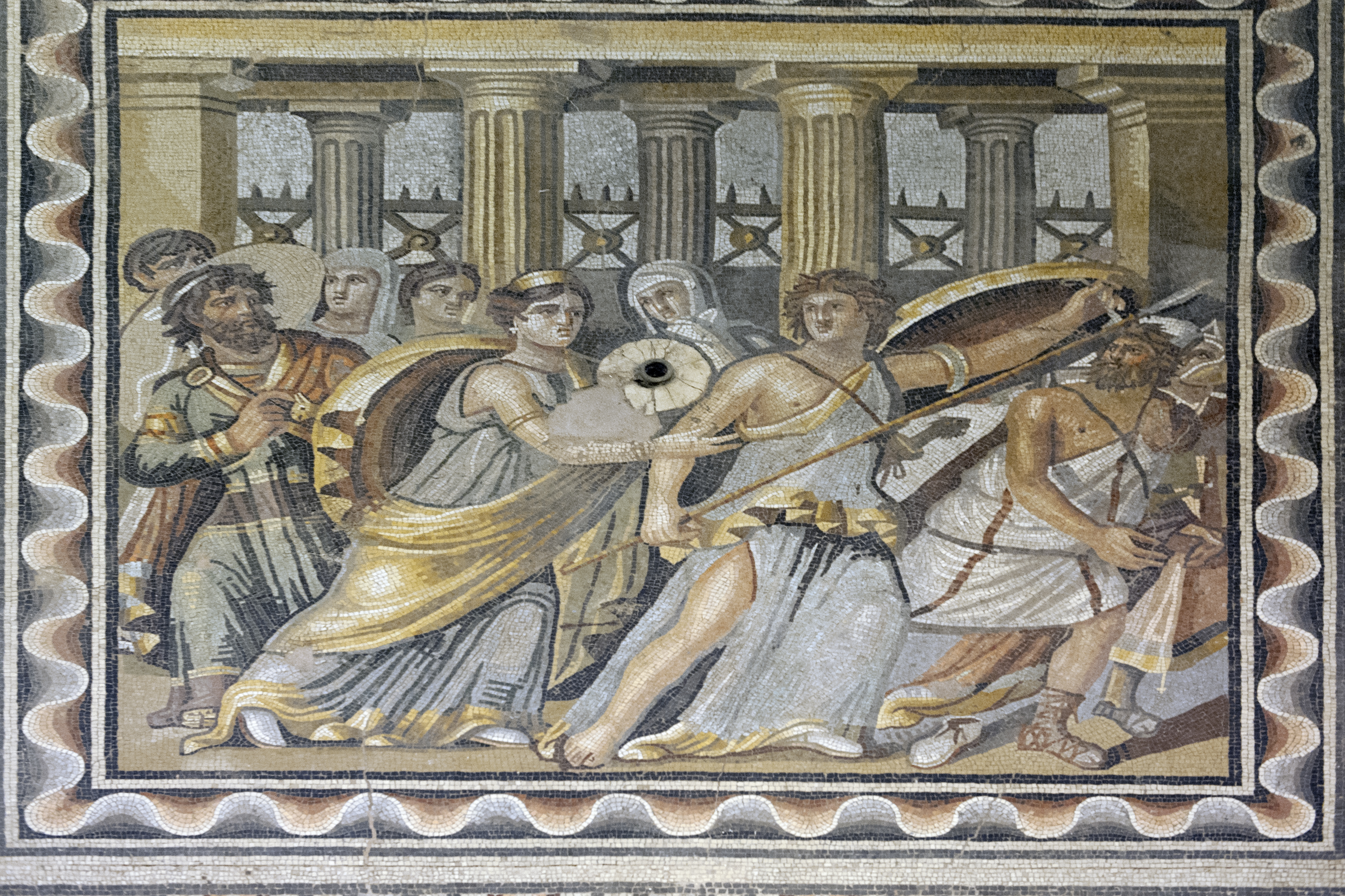
Gaziantep Zeugma Museum Achilles mosaic

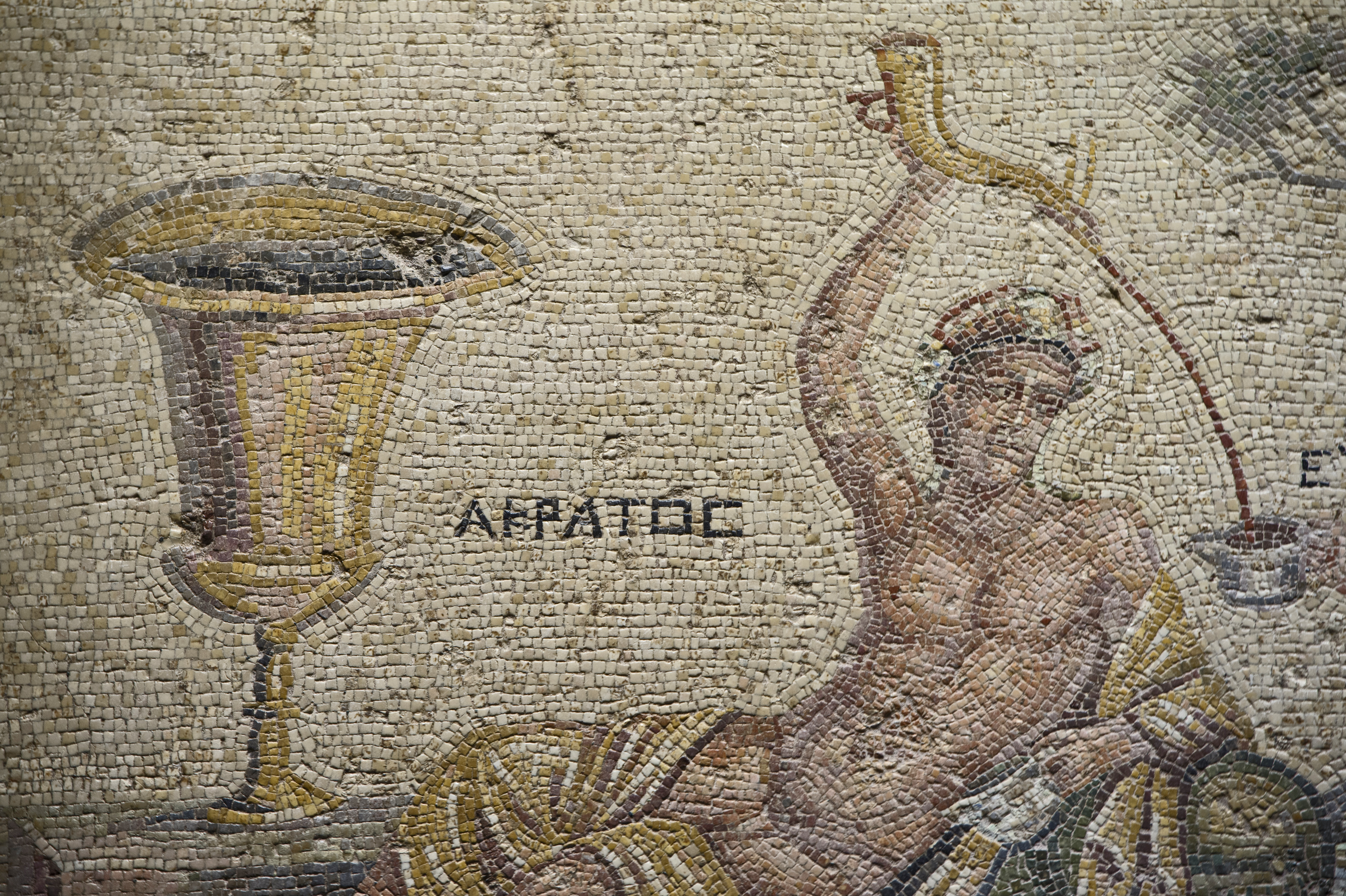
Gaziantep Zeugma Museum Acratus (Acratopotes) mosaic

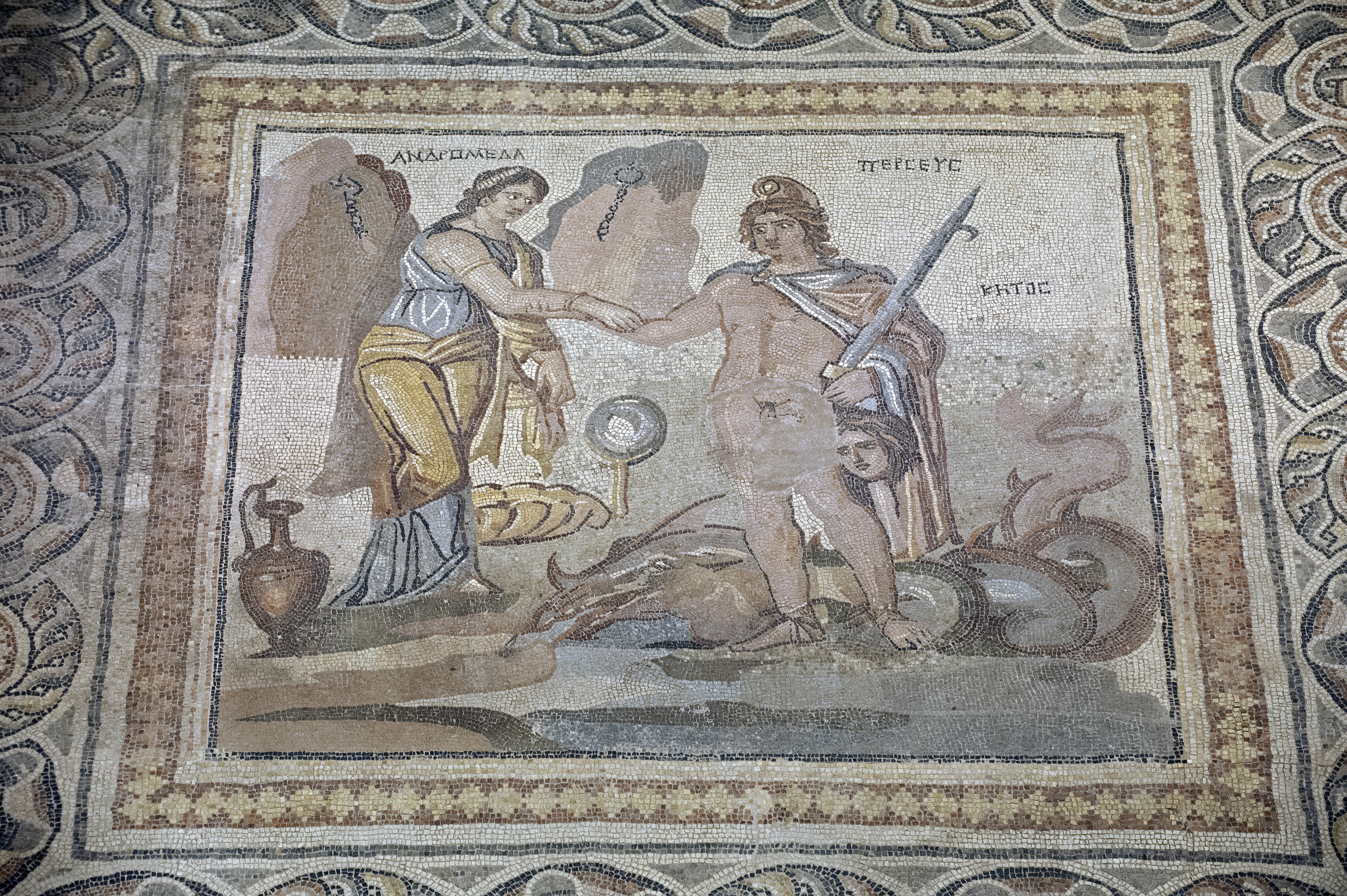
Gaziantep Zeugma Museum Andromeda mosaic

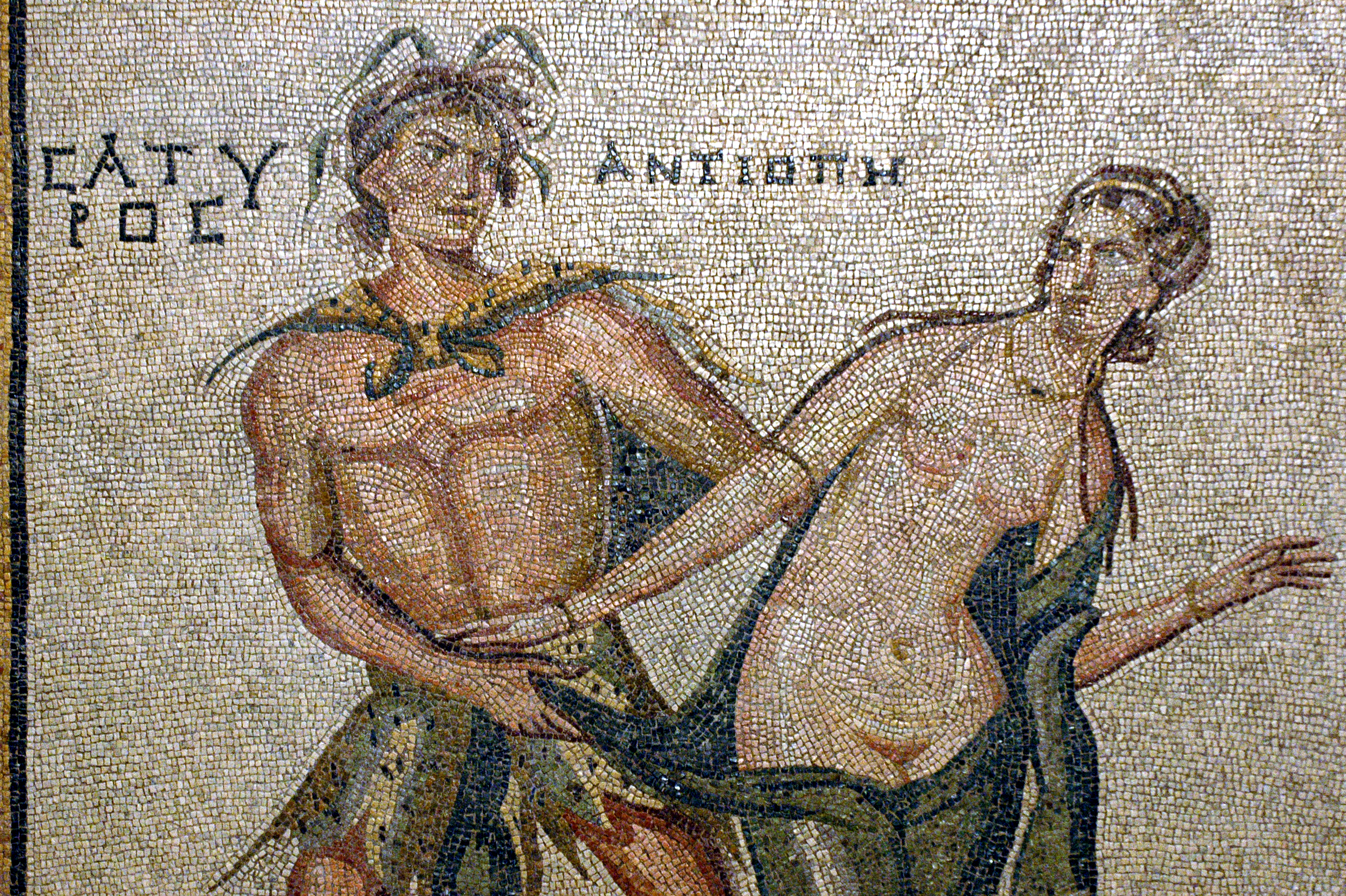
Gaziantep Zeugma Museum Antiope mosaic

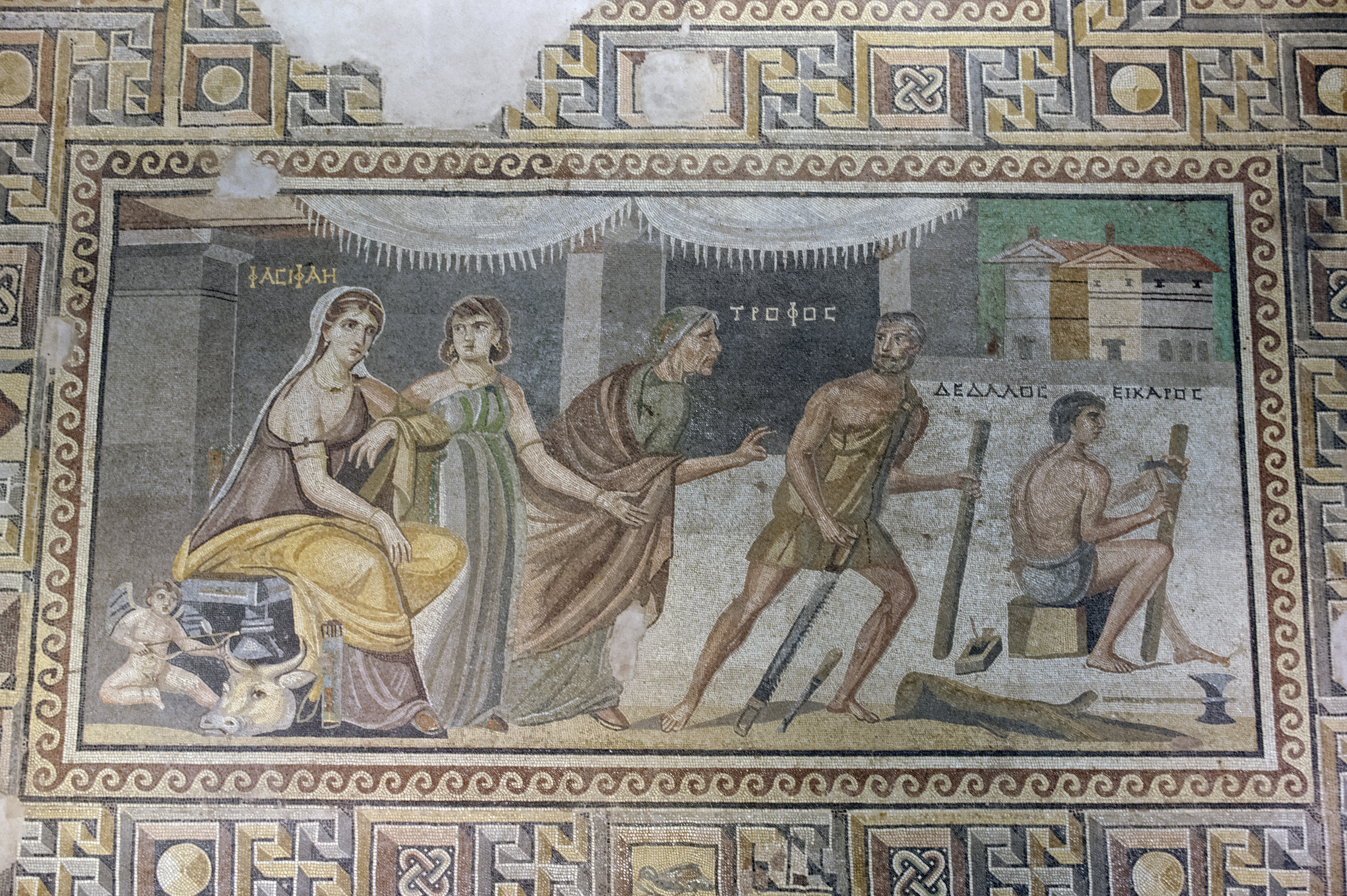
Gaziantep Zeugma Museum Daedalus mosaic

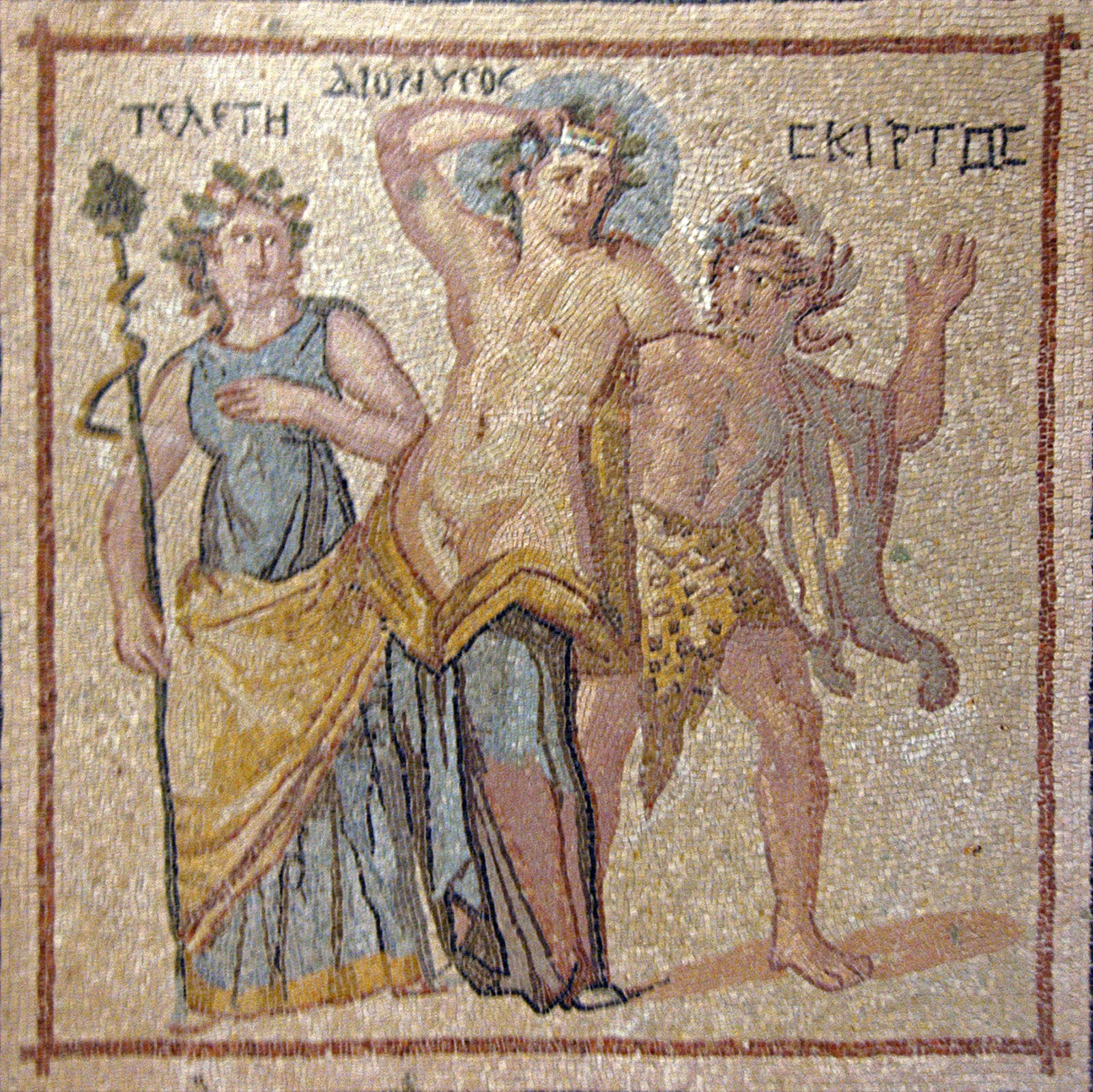
Gaziantep Zeugma Museum Dionysos mosaic

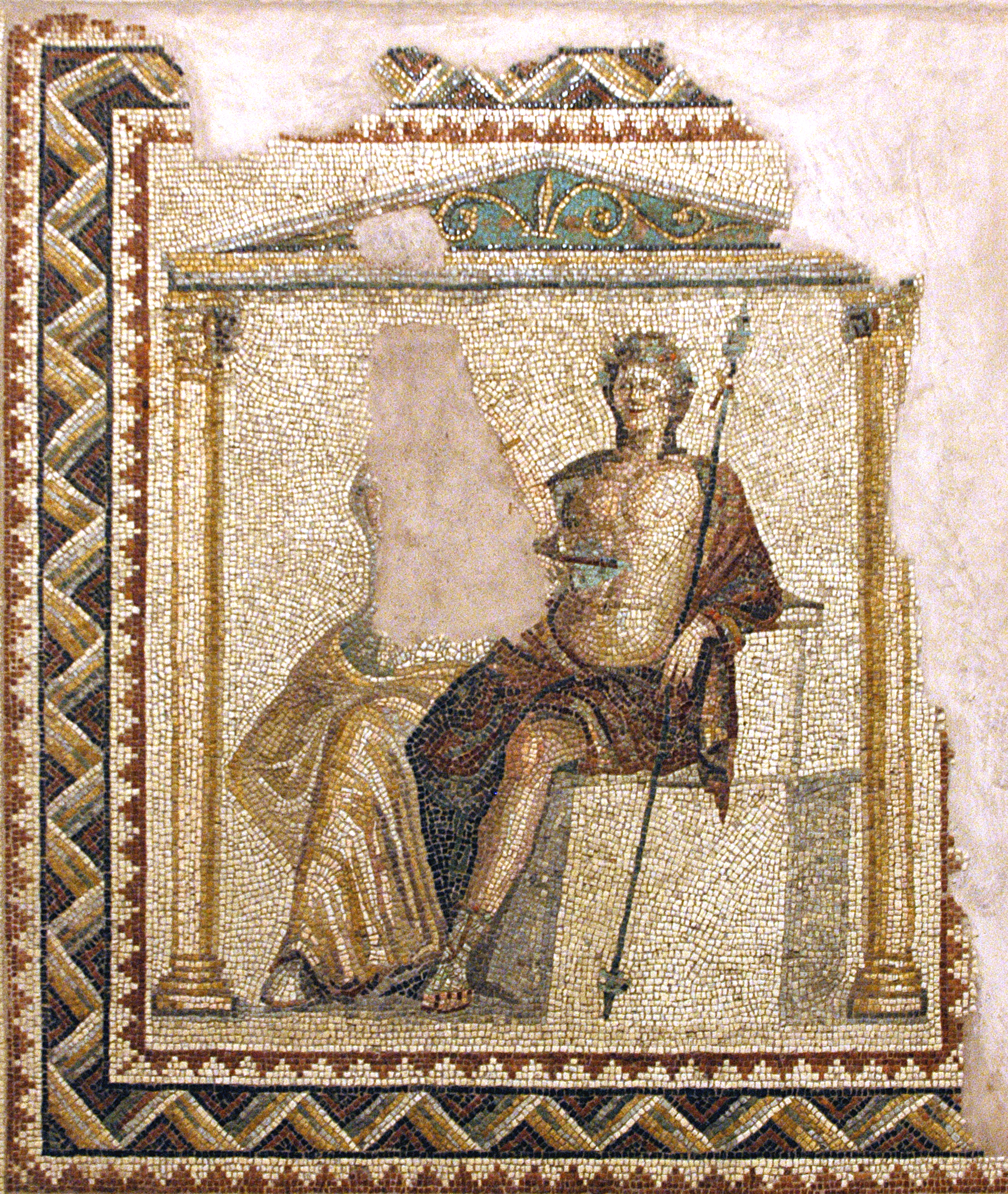
Gaziantep Zeugma Museum Dionysos and Ariadne mosaic

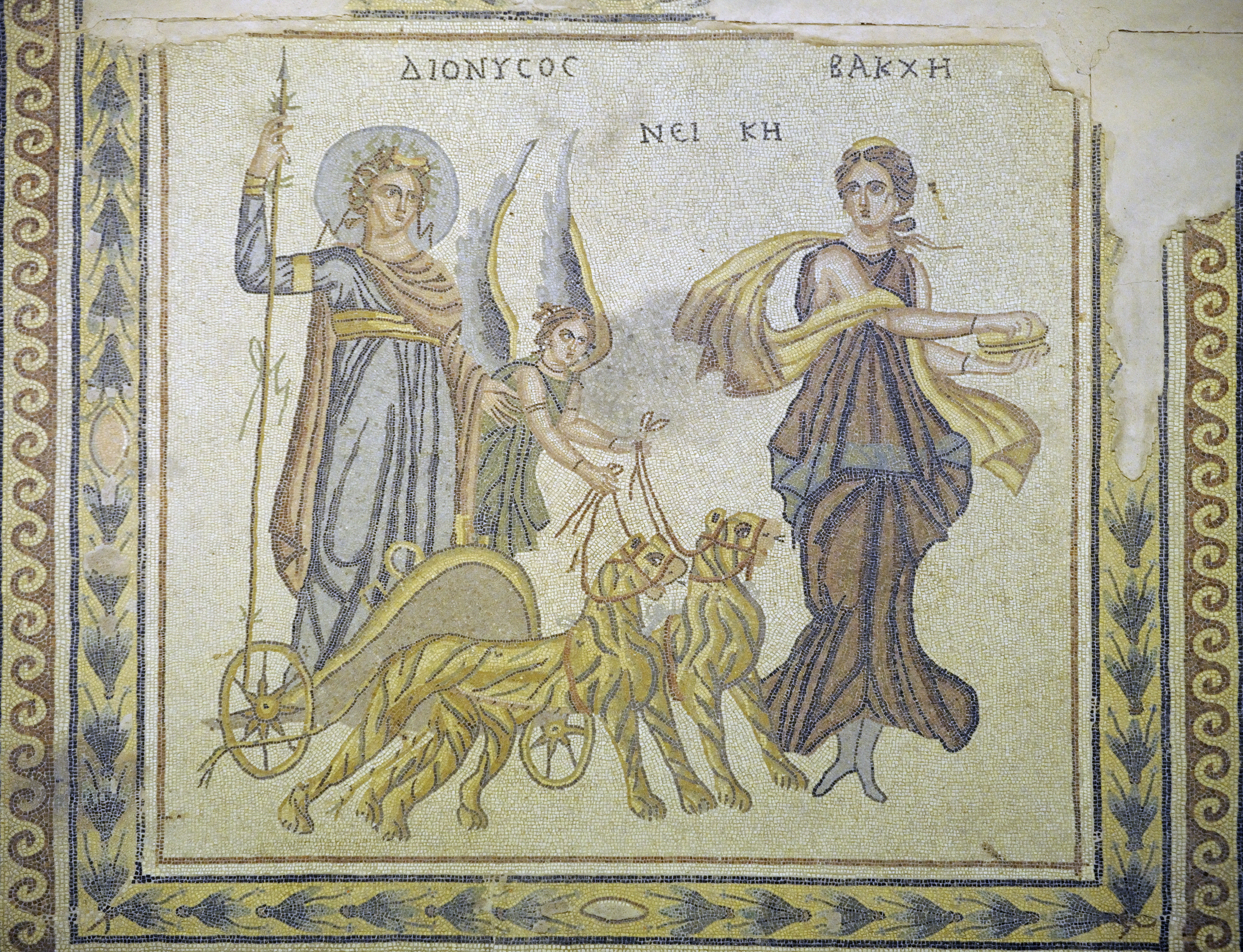
Gaziantep Zeugma Museum Dionysos Triumph mosaic

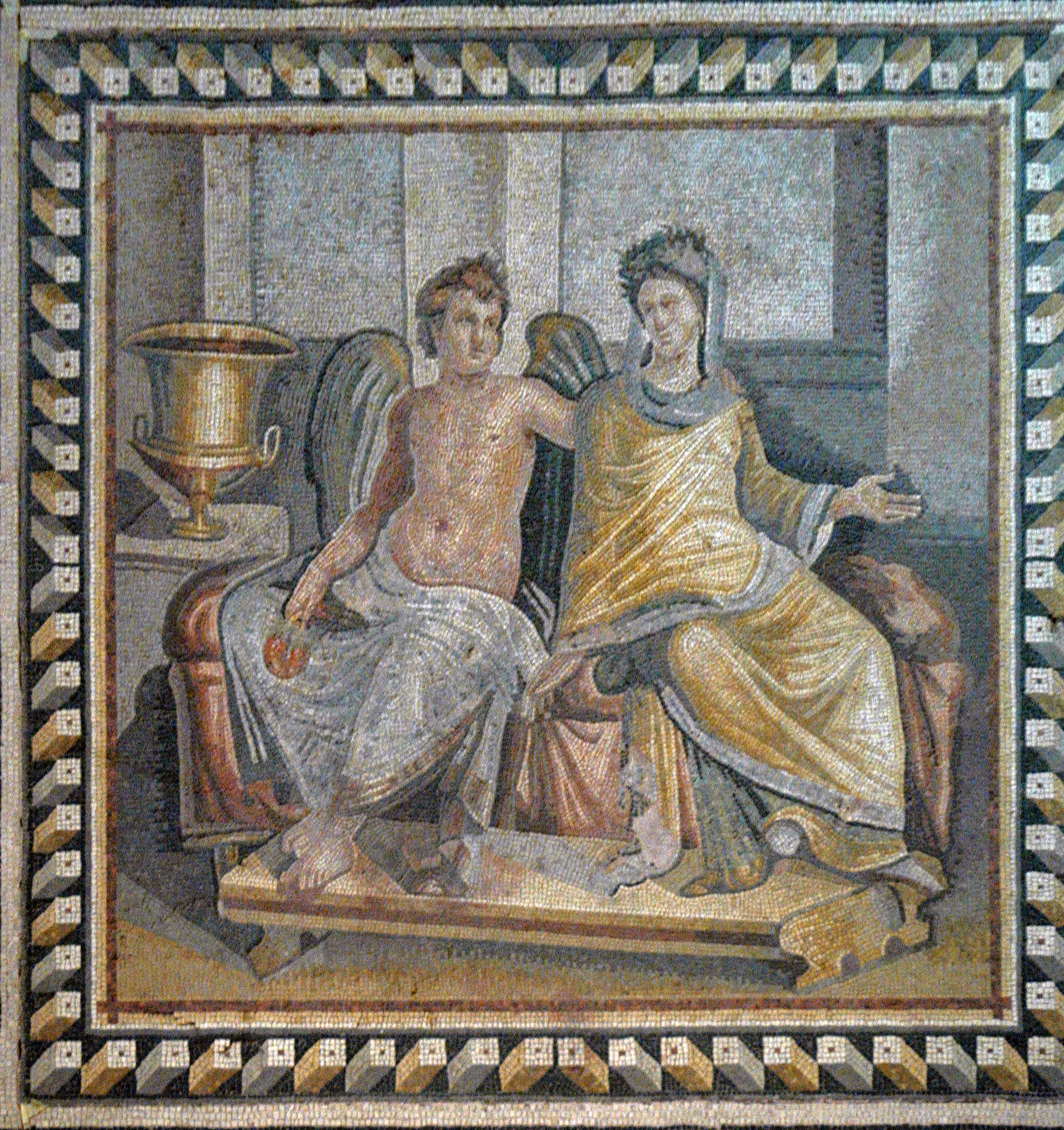
Gaziantep Zeugma Museum Eros and Psyche mosaic

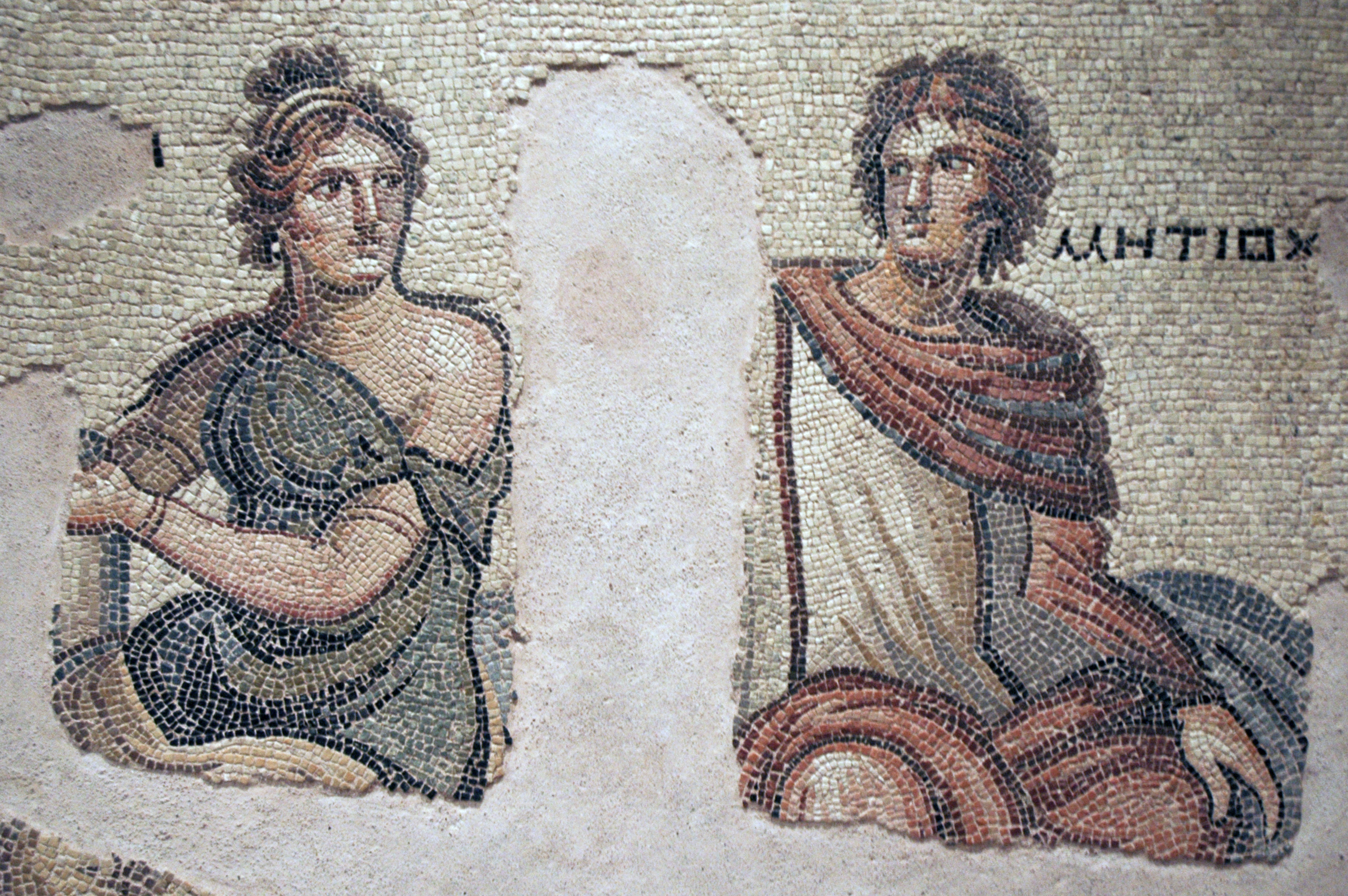
Gaziantep Zeugma Museum Methiokos mosaic

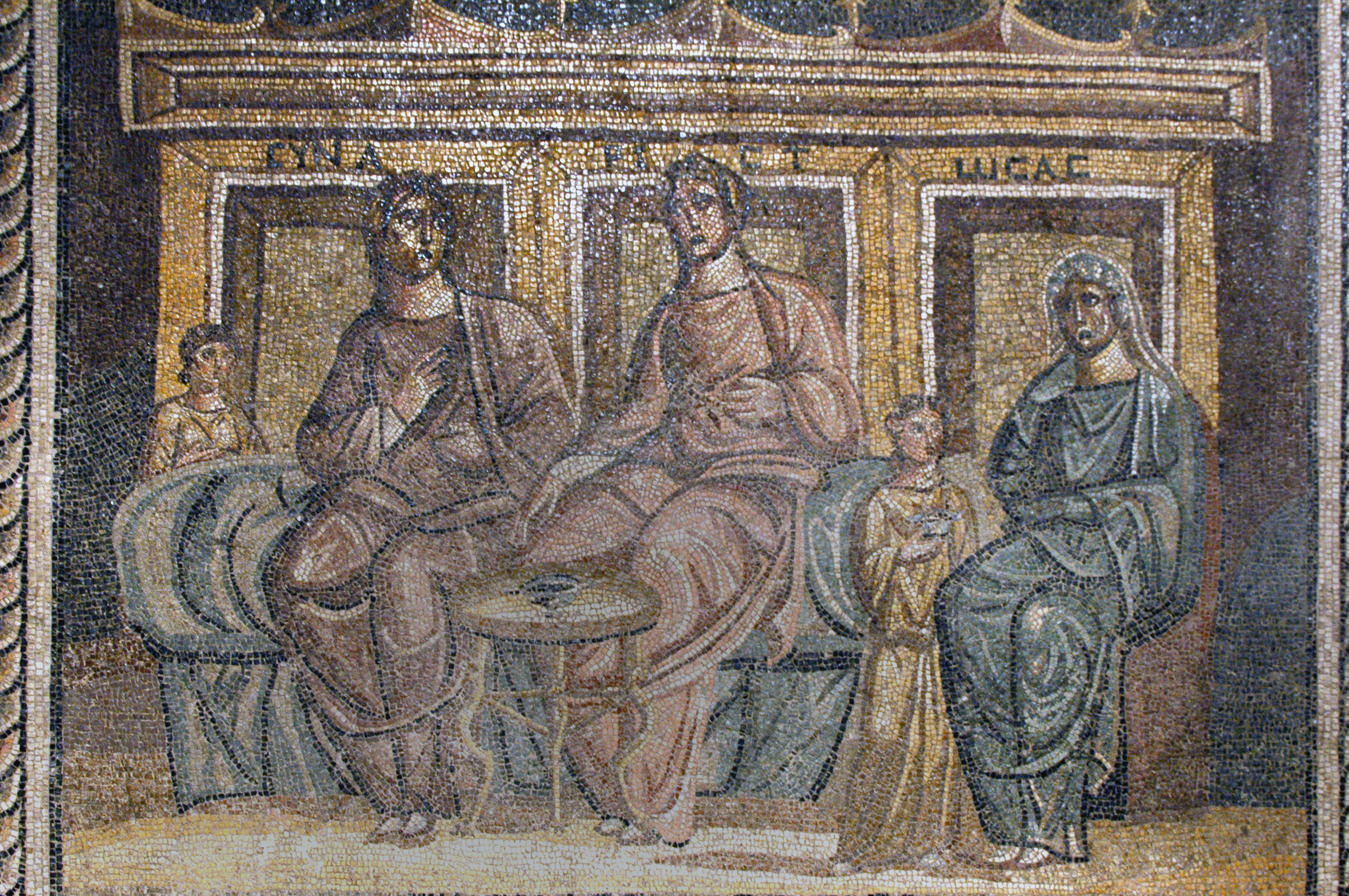
Gaziantep Zeugma Museum Women at breakfast aka Drama Group mosaic

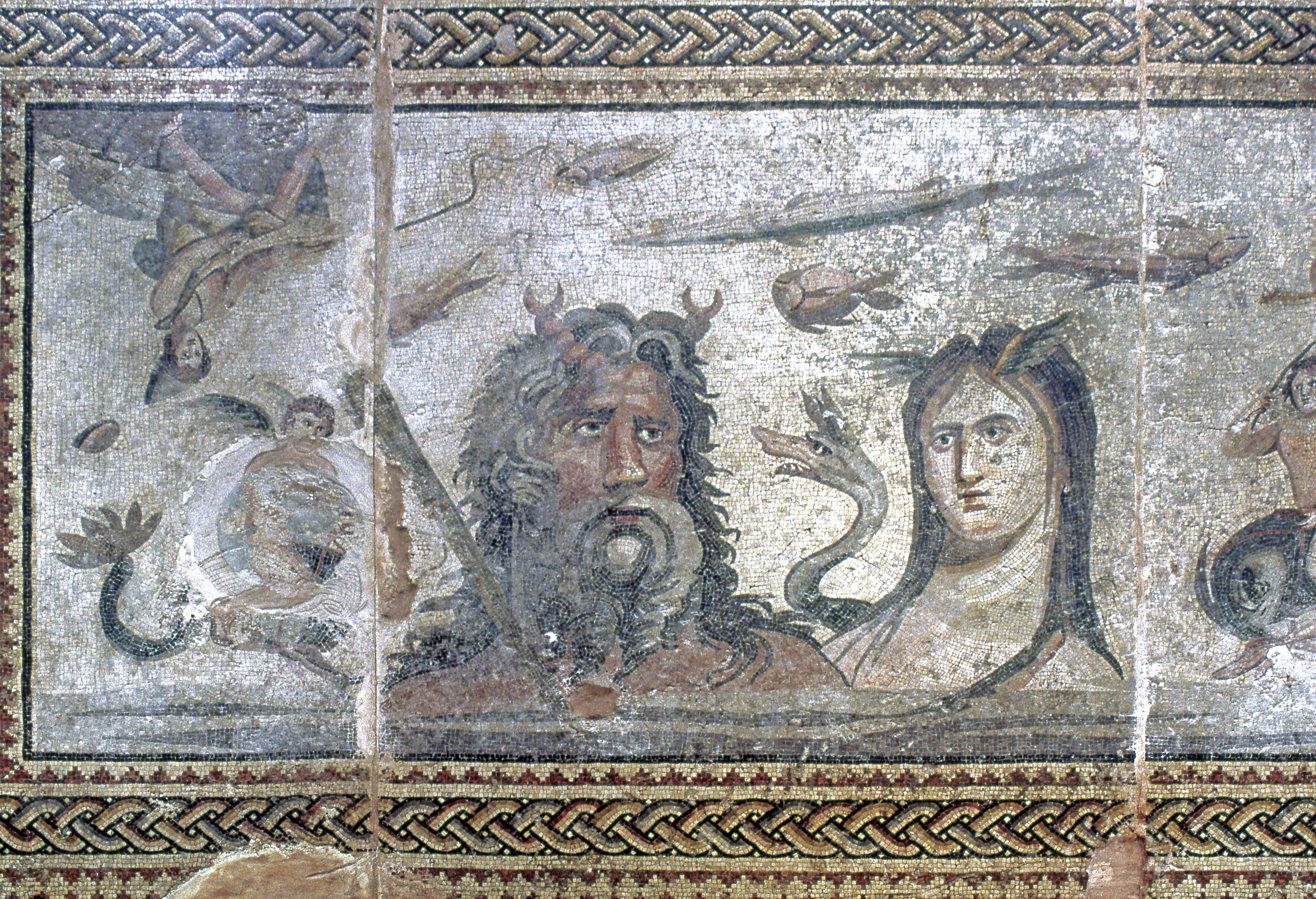
Gaziantep Zeugma Museum Oceanus and Thetys 1 mosaic

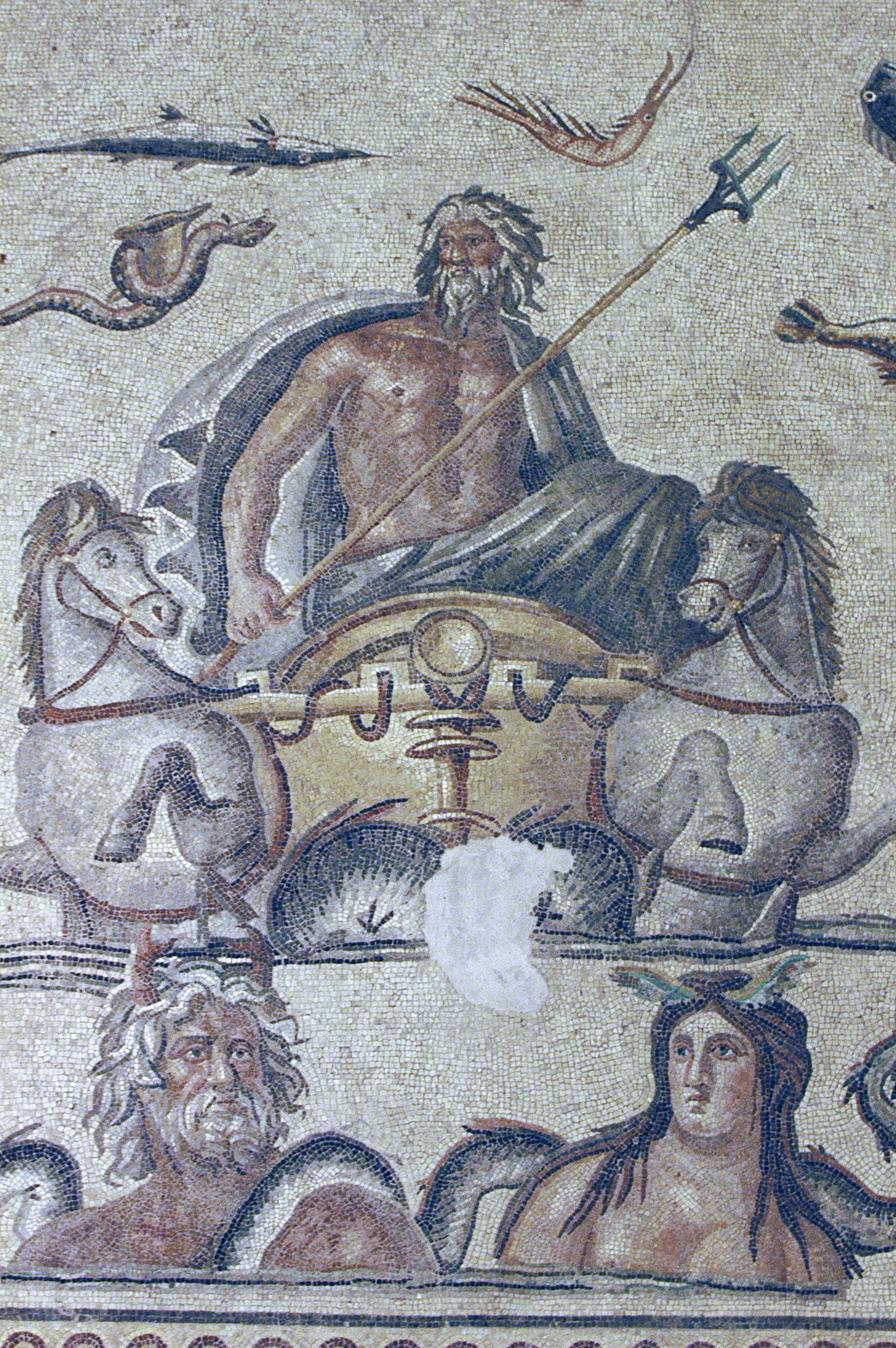
Gaziantep Zeugma Museum Oceanus and Thetys 2 mosaic

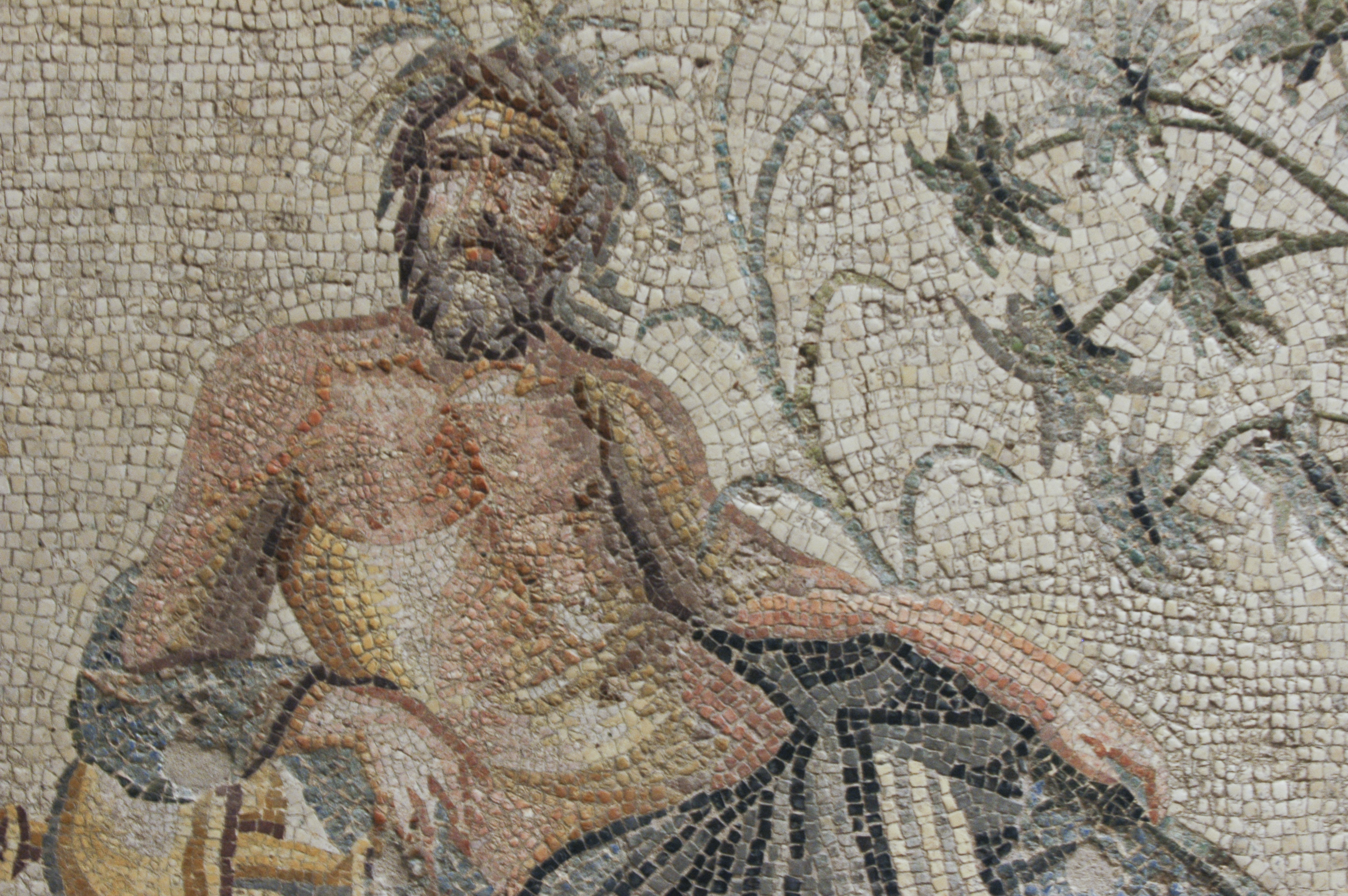
Gaziantep Zeugma Museum Water gods mosaic

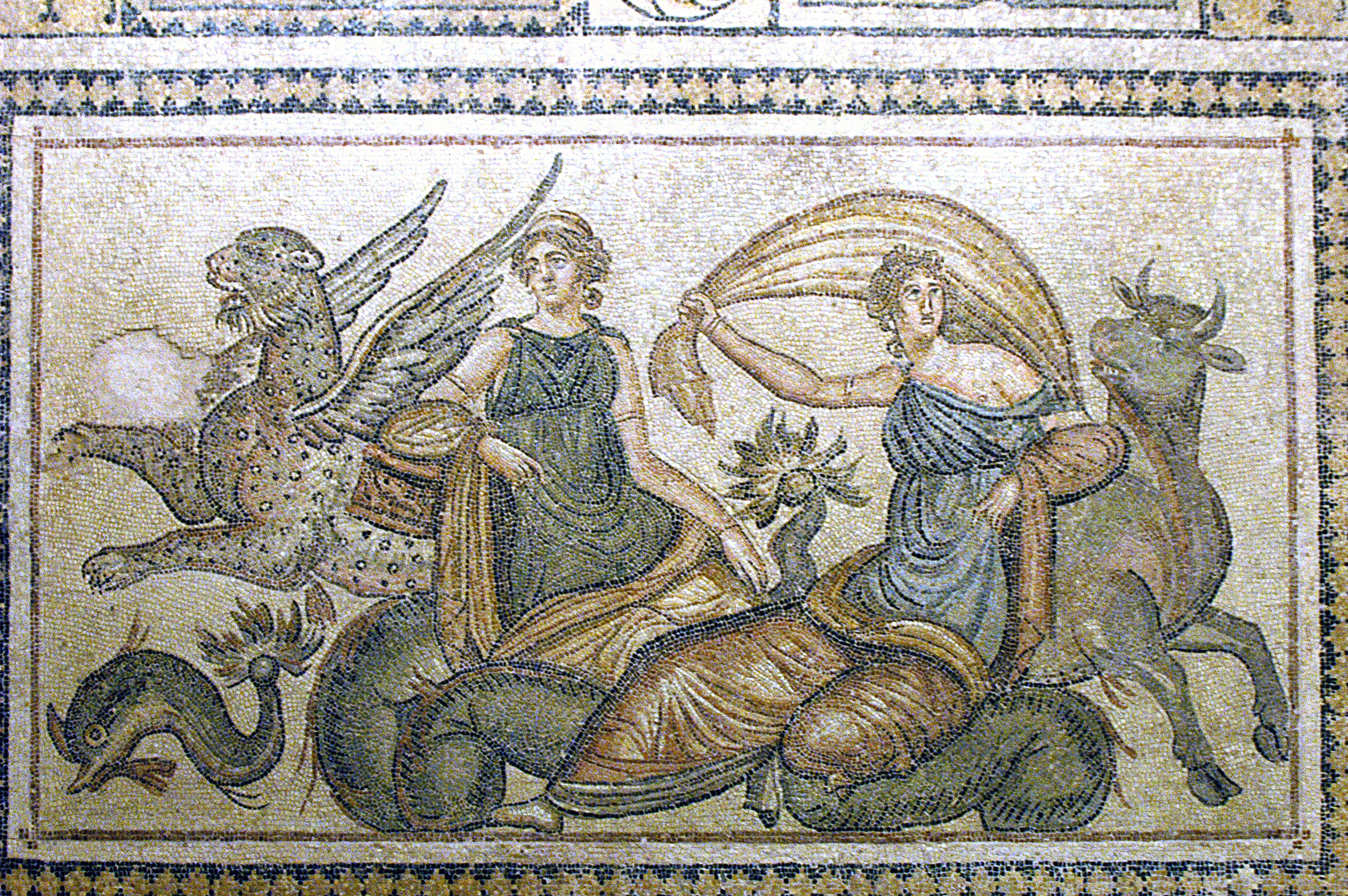
Gaziantep Zeugma Museum Zeus and Europa mosaic

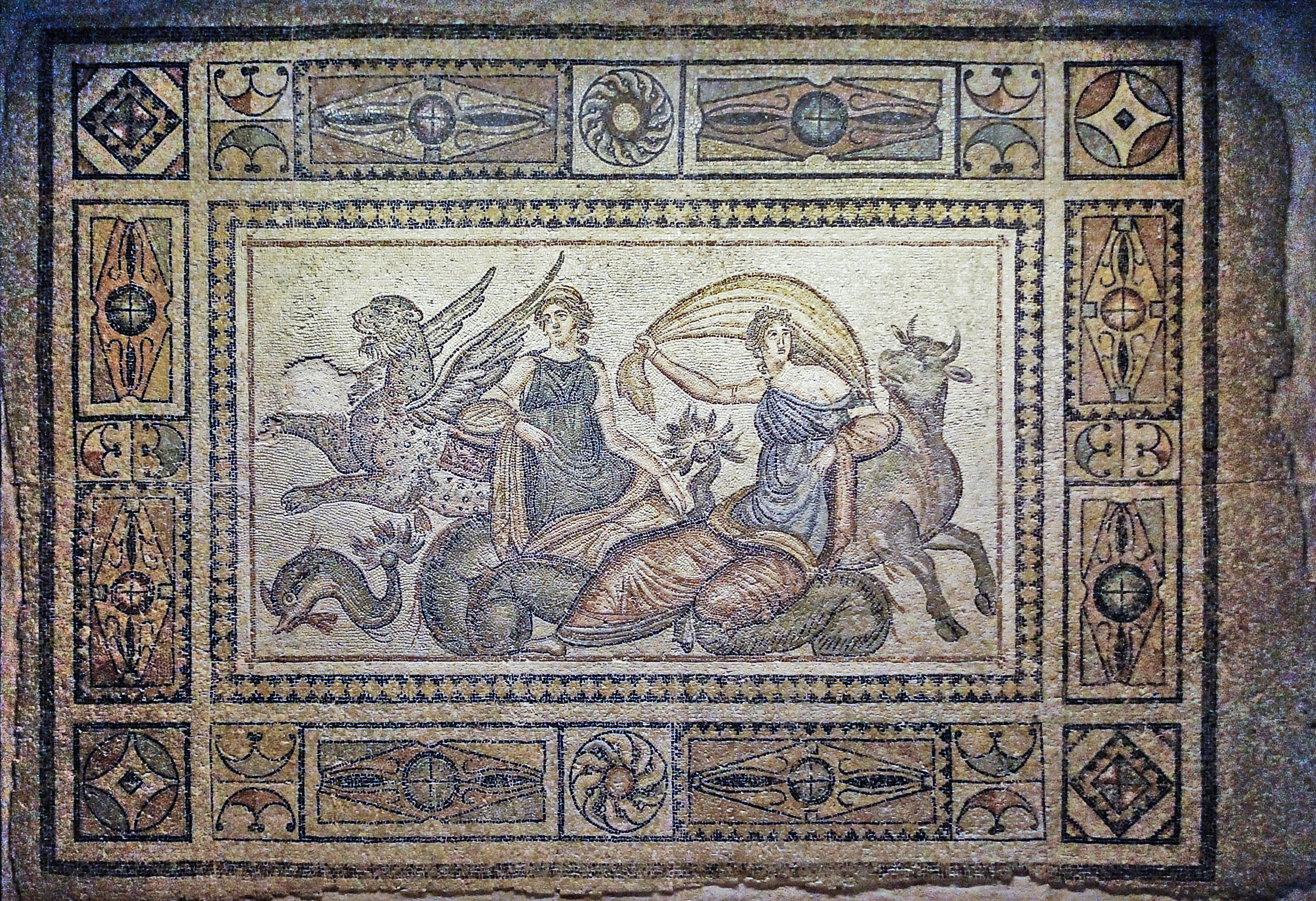
Kidnapping of Europa

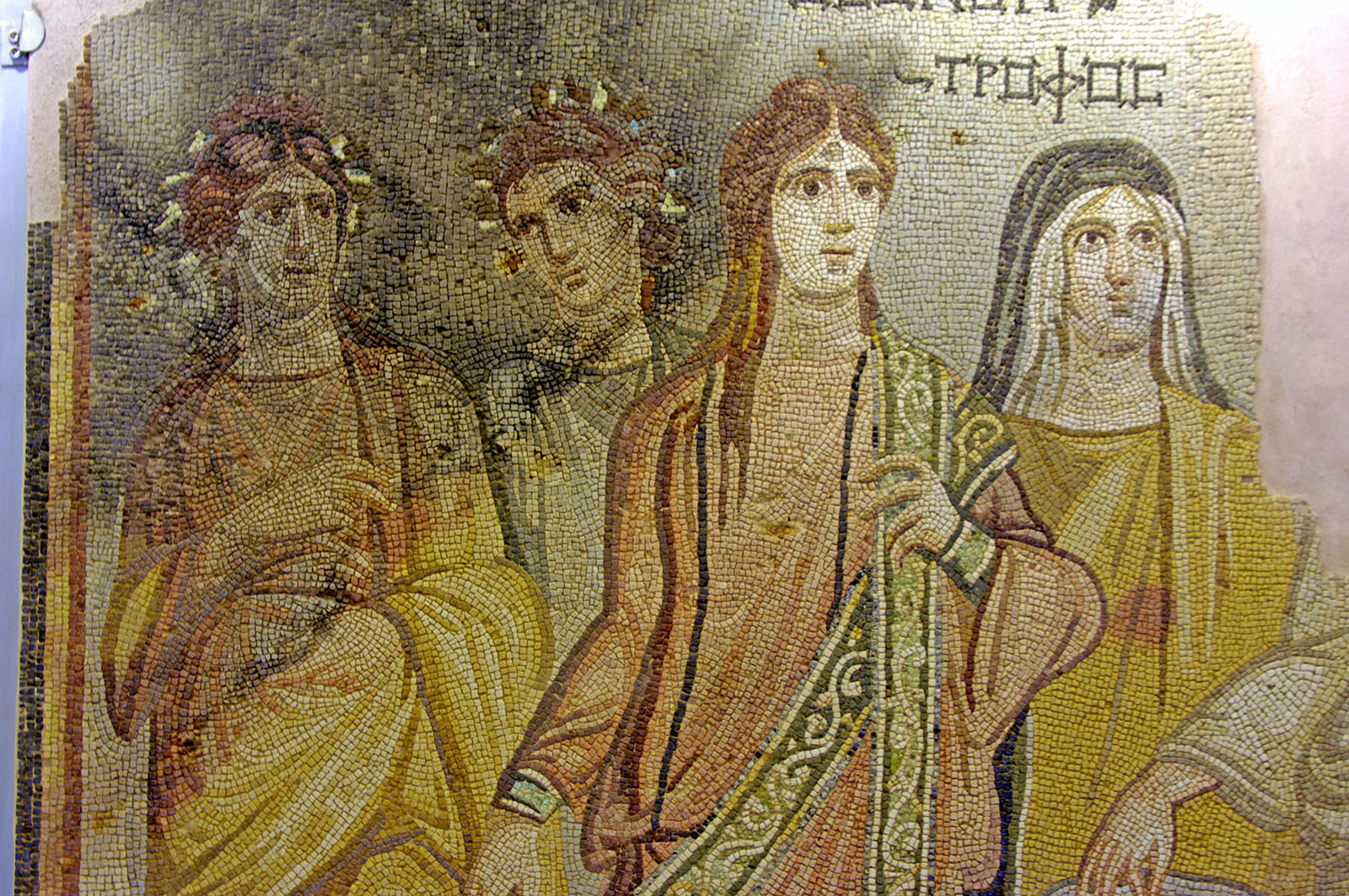
Gaziantep Zeugma Museum Unidentified mosaic

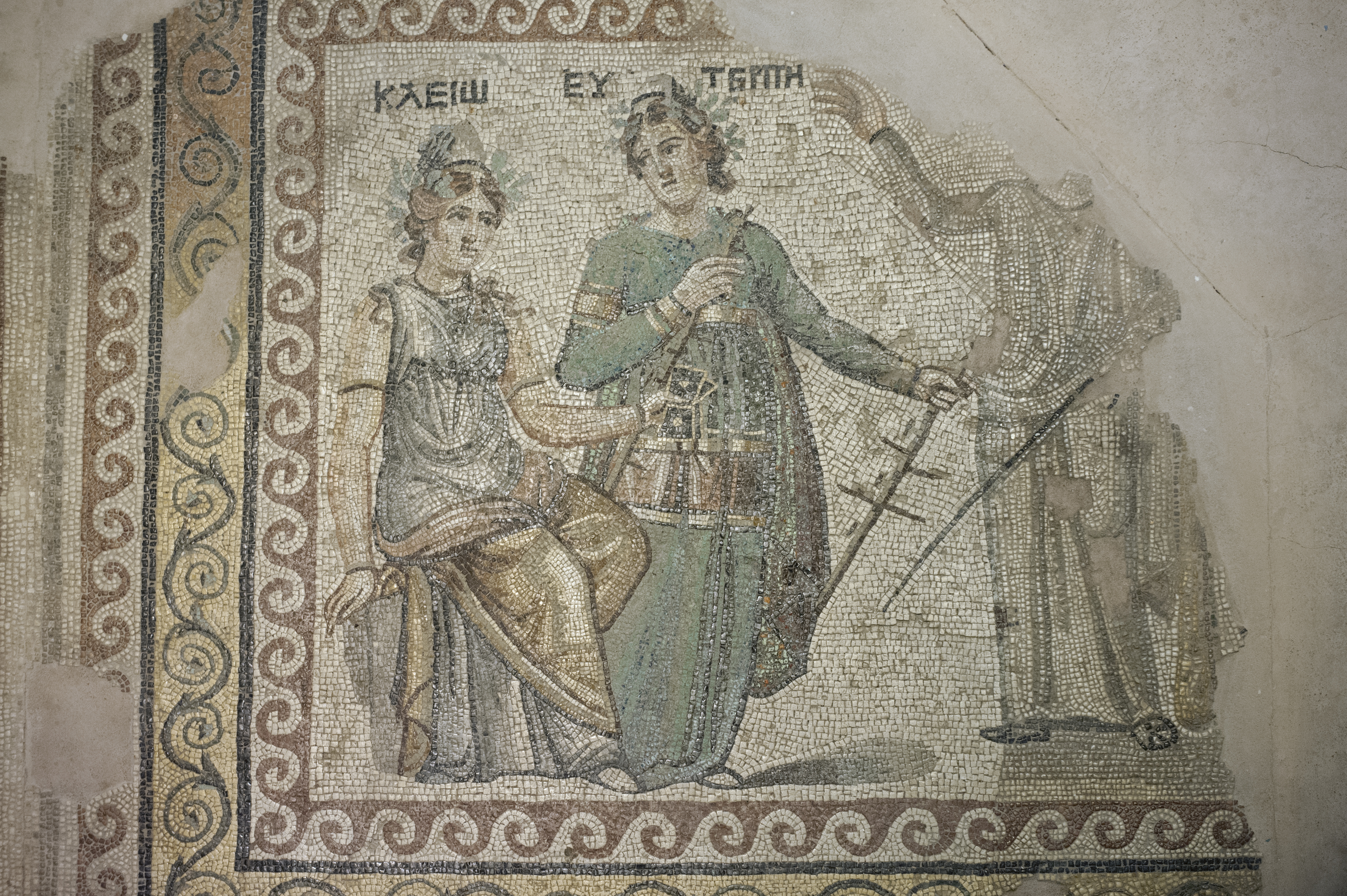
Gaziantep Zeugma Museum Clio and Euterpe mosaic

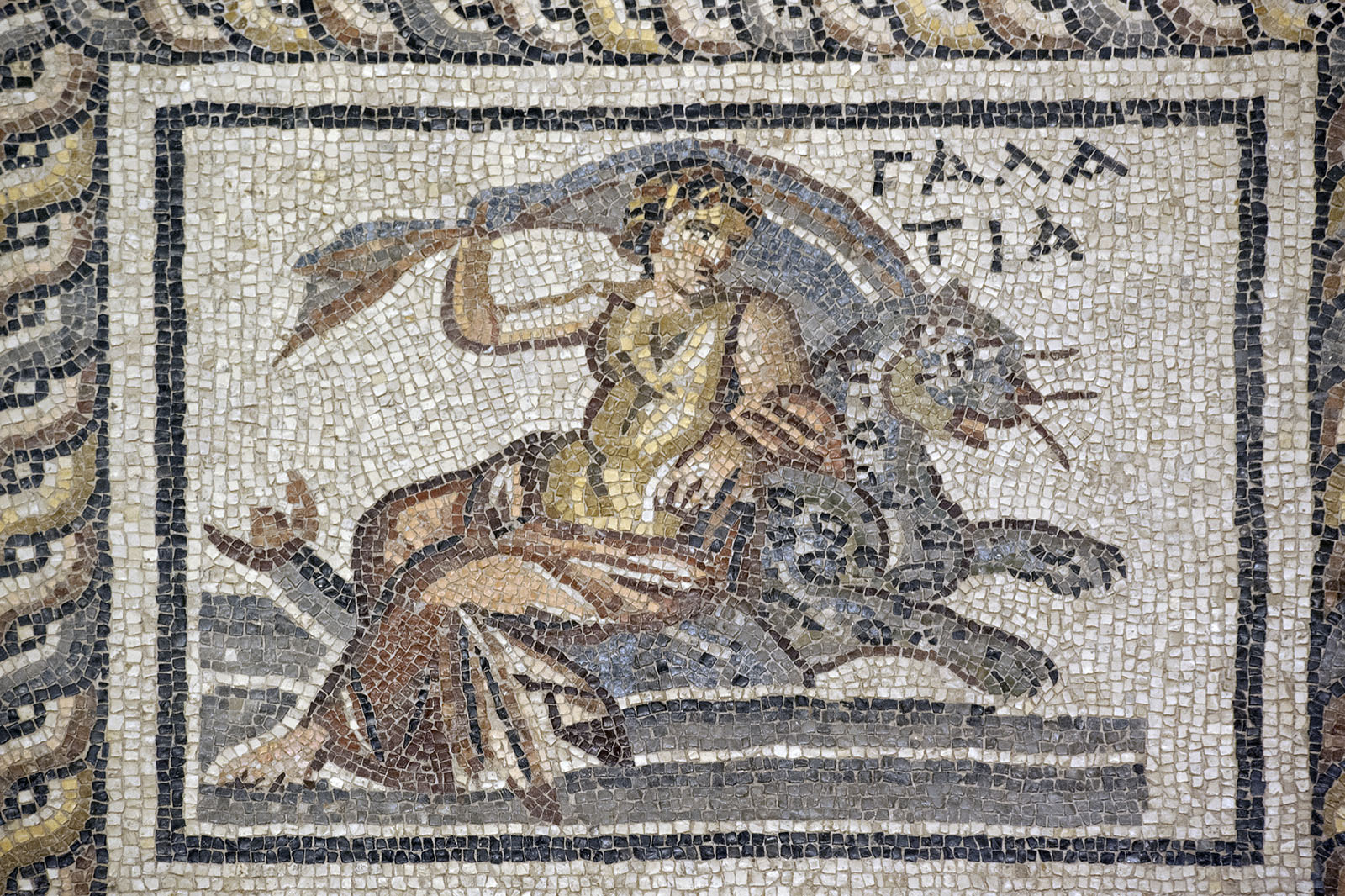
Gaziantep Zeugma Museum Galatea mosaic

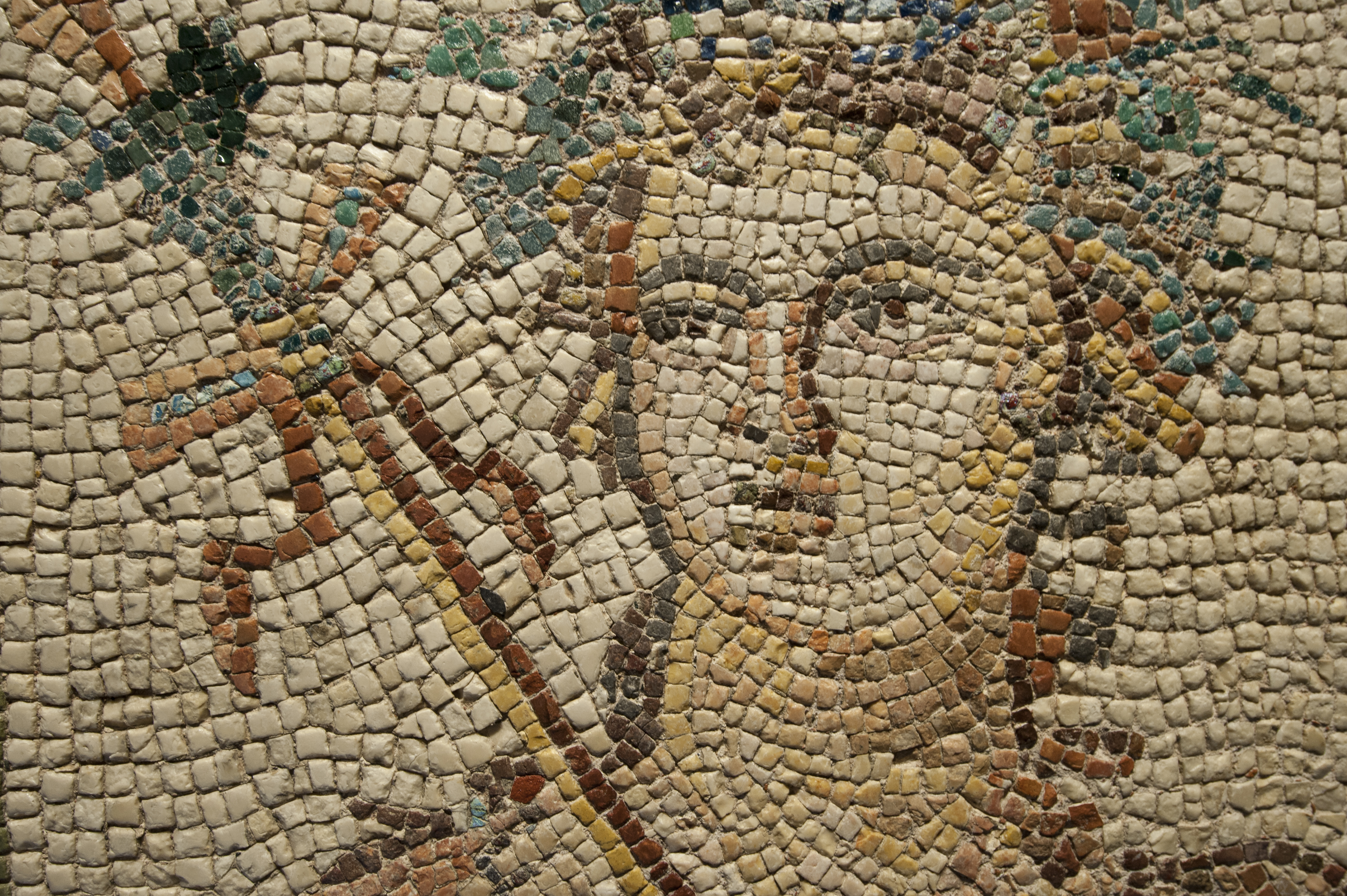
Gaziantep Zeugma Museum Unidentified mosaic
