= Acratus =

Acratus is a classical name attributed to the following individuals:

- Acratus (Greek: Ἄκρατος) is also the name by which Pausanias called the hero Acratopotes.
- Acratus was a freedman of Nero. He was sent by Nero in 64 AD to Asia and Achaea to plunder the temples and take away the statues of the gods.
