= Zeugma (Commagene) =

Ancient city of Commagene in modern-day Turkey

- Ζεῦγμα (Ancient Greek)
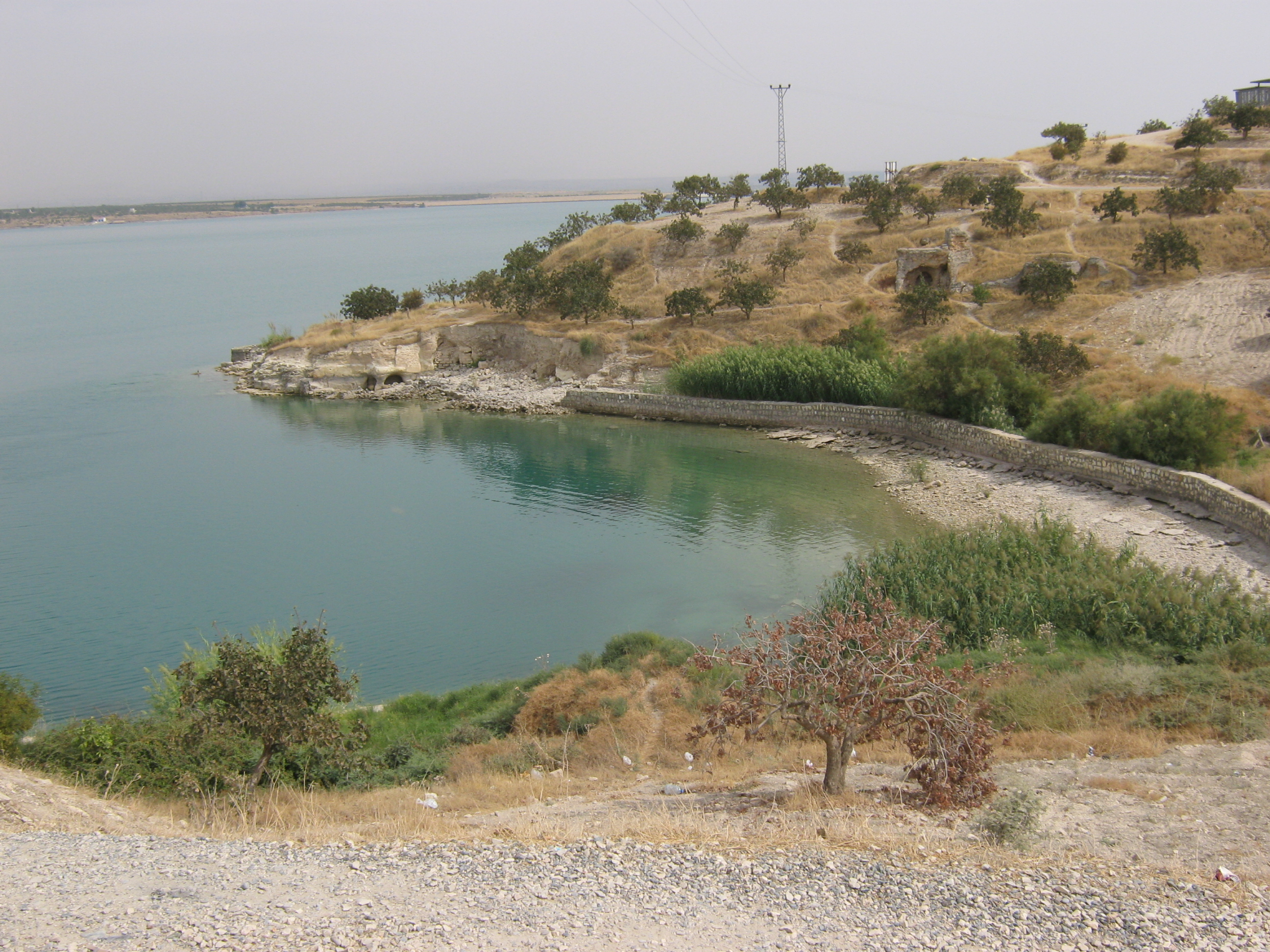
- Parts of Zeugma have become submerged in the Euphrates since the construction of the Birecik Dam

- Location within Turkey
- 37°3′31″N 37°51′57″E
- Type: Settlement
- Location: Belkis, Gaziantep Province, Turkey
- Region: Commagene

History
- Built: 300 BC
- Built by: Seleucus I Nicator

Site notes
- Condition: Partially submerged

Zeugma (Ancient Greek: Ζεῦγμα; Syriac: ܙܘܓܡܐ) was an ancient Hellenistic era Greek and then Roman city of Commagene; located in modern Gaziantep Province, Turkey. It was named for the bridge of boats, or zeugma, that crossed the Euphrates at that location. Zeugma Mosaic Museum contains mosaics from the site, and is one of the largest mosaic museums in the world.

== History ==
Zeugma was founded soon after 300 BC as the city of Seleucia by Seleucus I Nicator, a Diadochus (successor) to Alexander the Great and Macedonian founder of the Seleucid Kingdom, on the site where he had the first bridge over the Euphrates built. In 64 BC, the Roman Republic gained control of the city. Zeugma was of great importance to the Roman Empire as it was located at a strategically important place. Up to 70,000 people lived in the city, and it became a center for the military and commerce for the ancient Romans. In 253 AD, it was destroyed by the Sassanids, but was later rebuilt.

In late antiquity, Zeugma was a diocese of the early Roman church, but the place seems to have been abandoned in the 7th century due to Sassanid Persian and then Arab raids by the Umayyad Caliphate. Arabs lived there temporarily in the Middle Ages. By the 17th century the Ottoman Turkish village of Belkis was built near the ruins.

== Preservation ==
Initially the site was excavated sporadically, but in 2000, was flooded during construction of the Birecik Dam. With only a fraction of the site excavated, archaeologists feared that many mosaics would be permanently lost. After reading about it in The New York Times, and with only few months left, American philanthropist David W. Packard donated USD 5 million to fund an emergency excavation of the archaeological site, allowing archaeologists to preserve the mosaics that would otherwise be inundated by the dam. The mosaics that were excavated were initially stored at the Gaziantep Museum, and are nowadays displayed at the Zeugma Mosaic Museum.

Zeugma has been on the UNESCO World Heritage Site tentative list since 2012. Extant archaeological remains at the site include "the Hellenistic Agora, the Roman Agora, two sanctuaries, the stadium, the theatre, two bathhouses, the Roman legionary base, administrative structures of the Roman legion, the majority of the residential quarters, Hellenistic and Roman city walls, and the East, South and West necropoles."

Three large glass mosaics were discovered at Zeugma in 2014, including one depicting the nine Muses.

The Zeugma Mosaic Museum attracted a record 340,569 visitors in 2019, according to the Turkish Culture and Tourism Ministry.

== Gallery ==
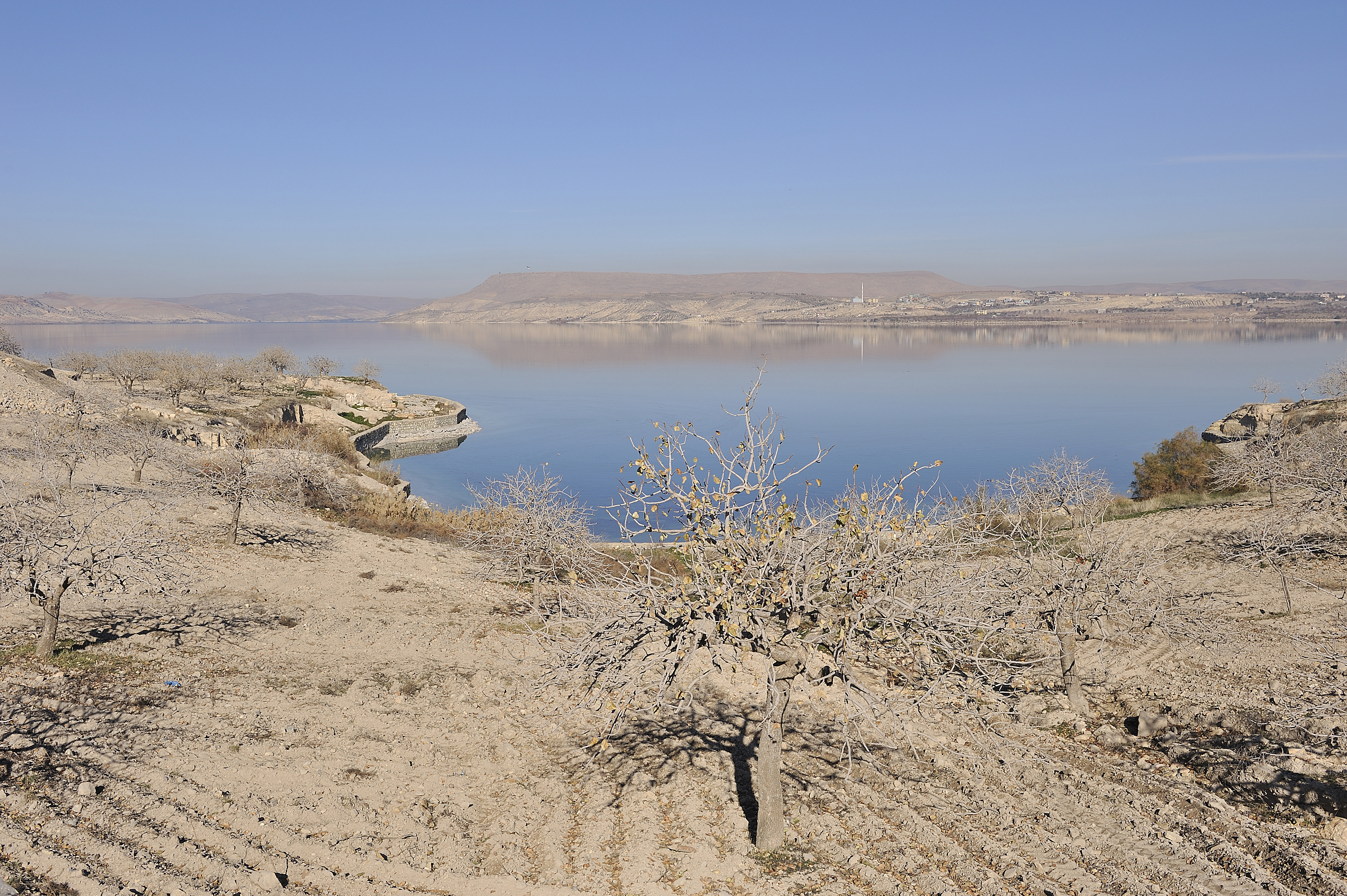
Zeugma, the lake

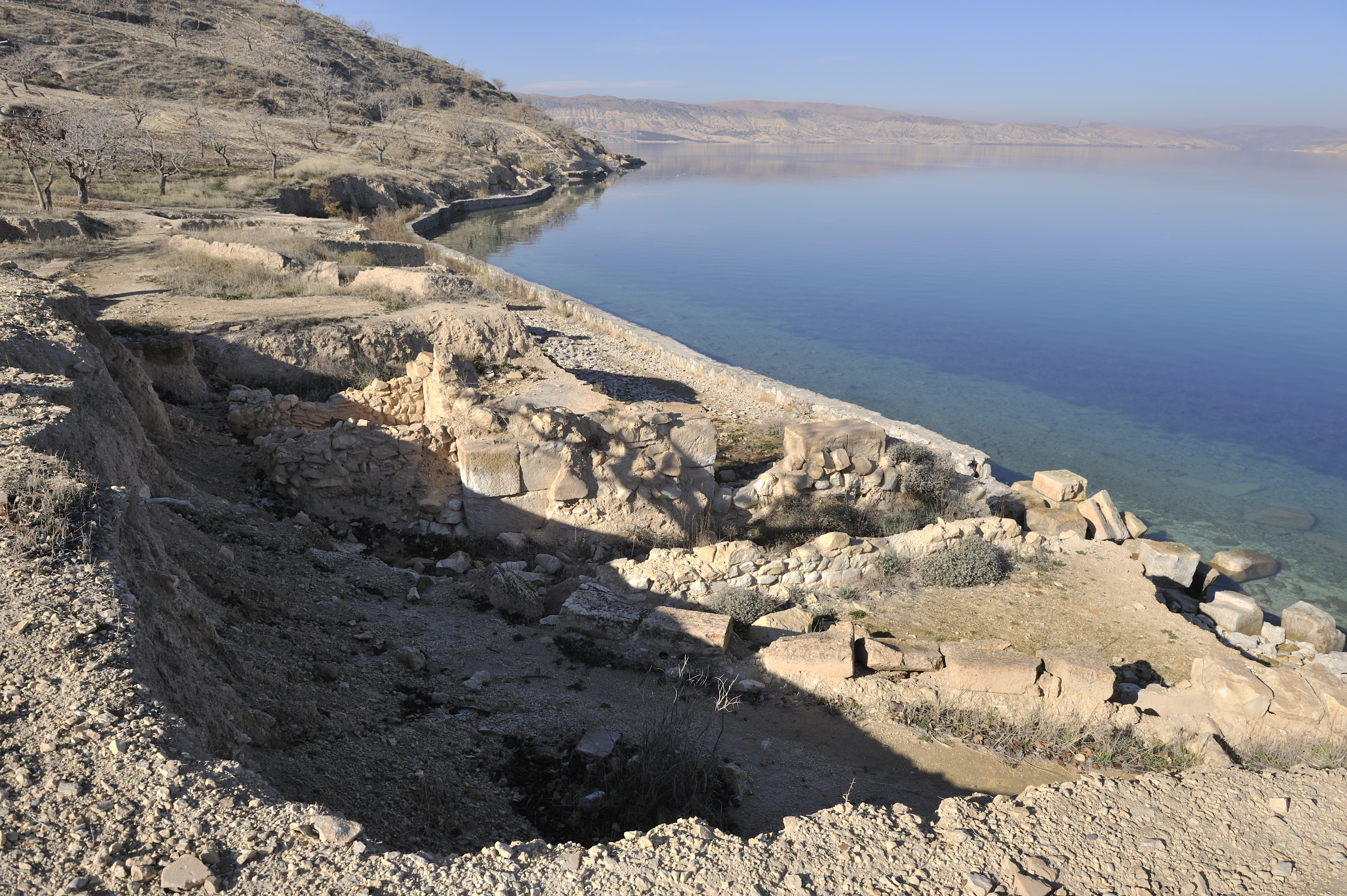
Zeugma excavations

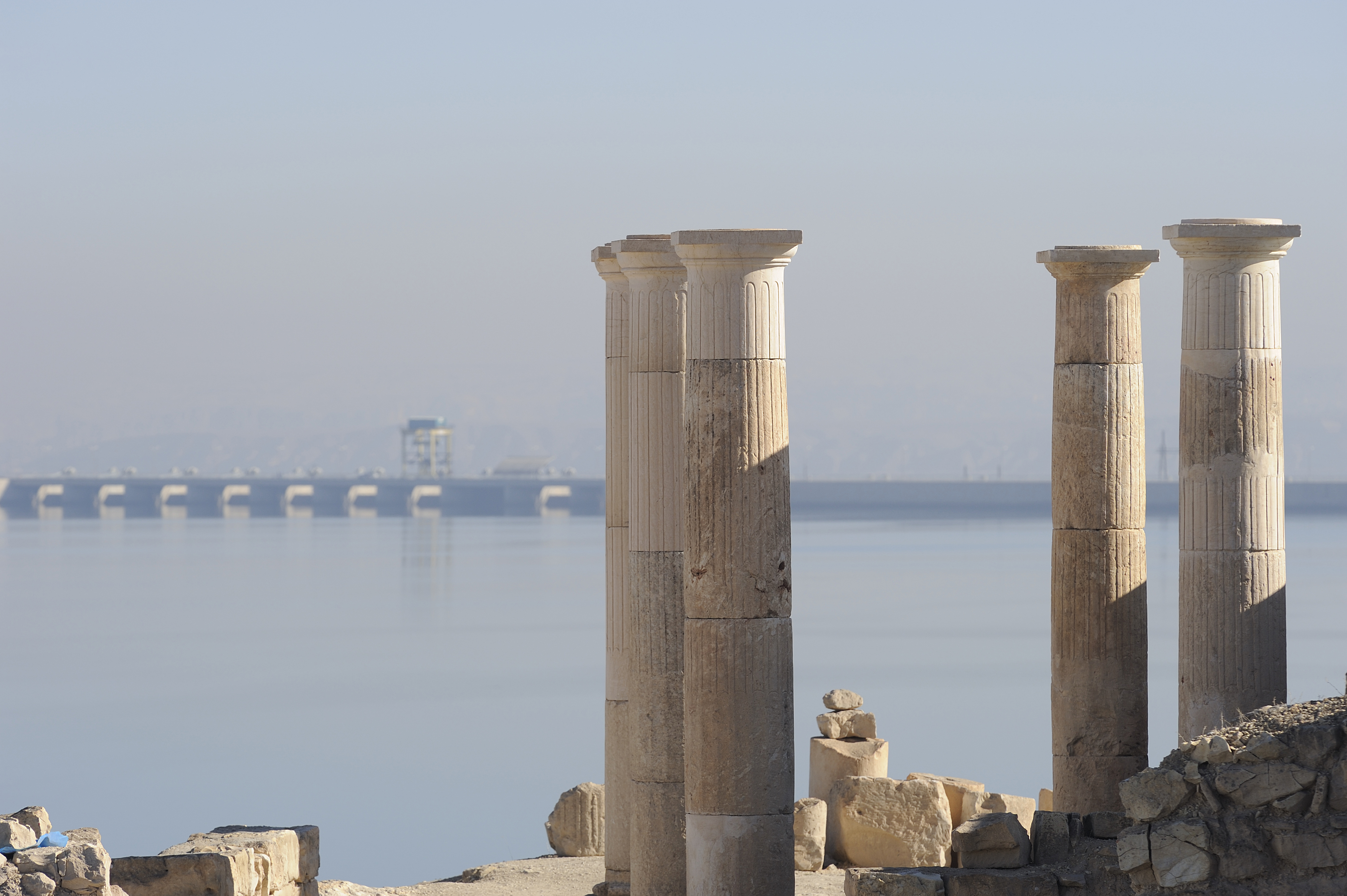
Zeugma excavations and dam

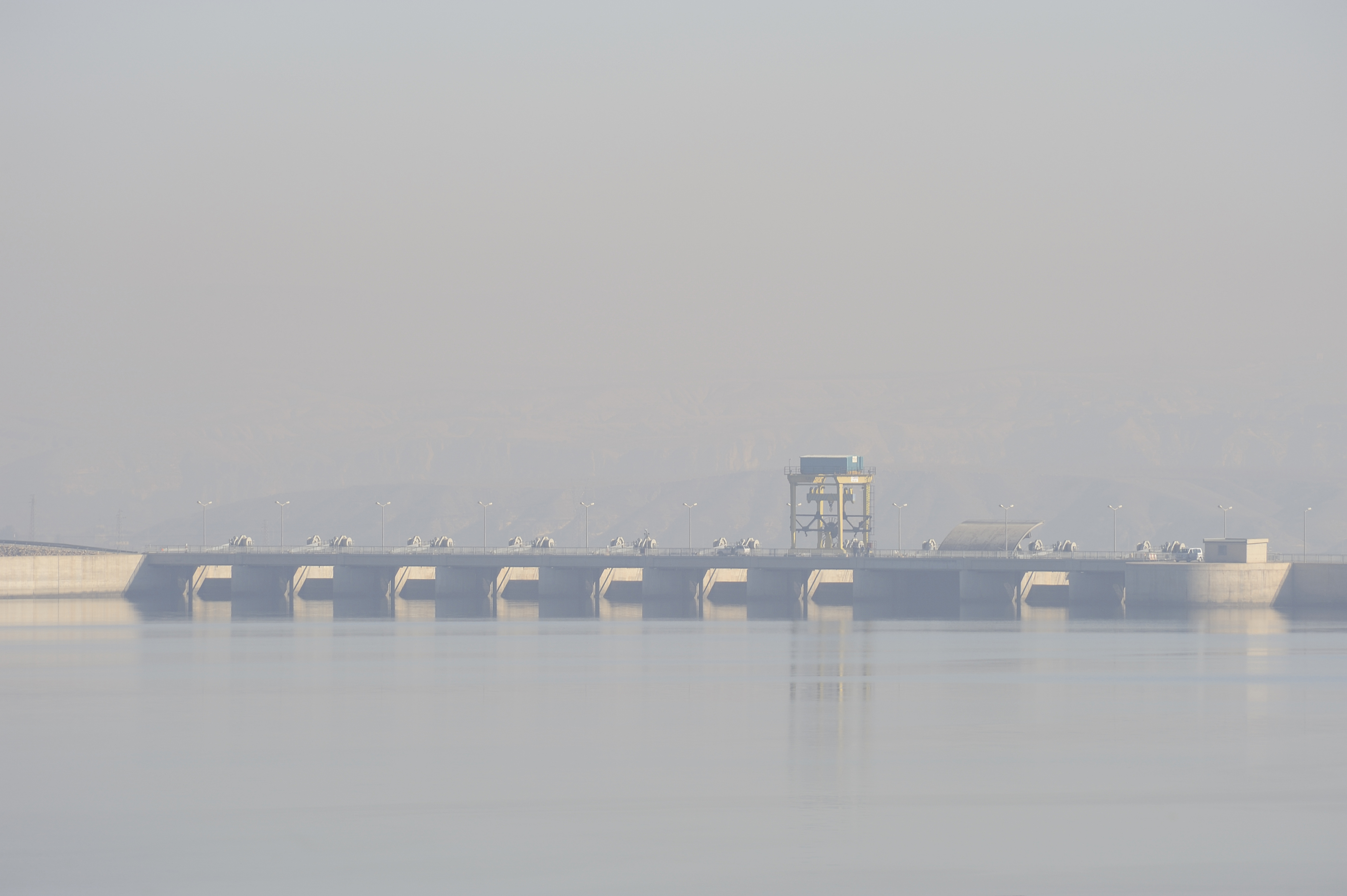
Zeugma, the dam nearby

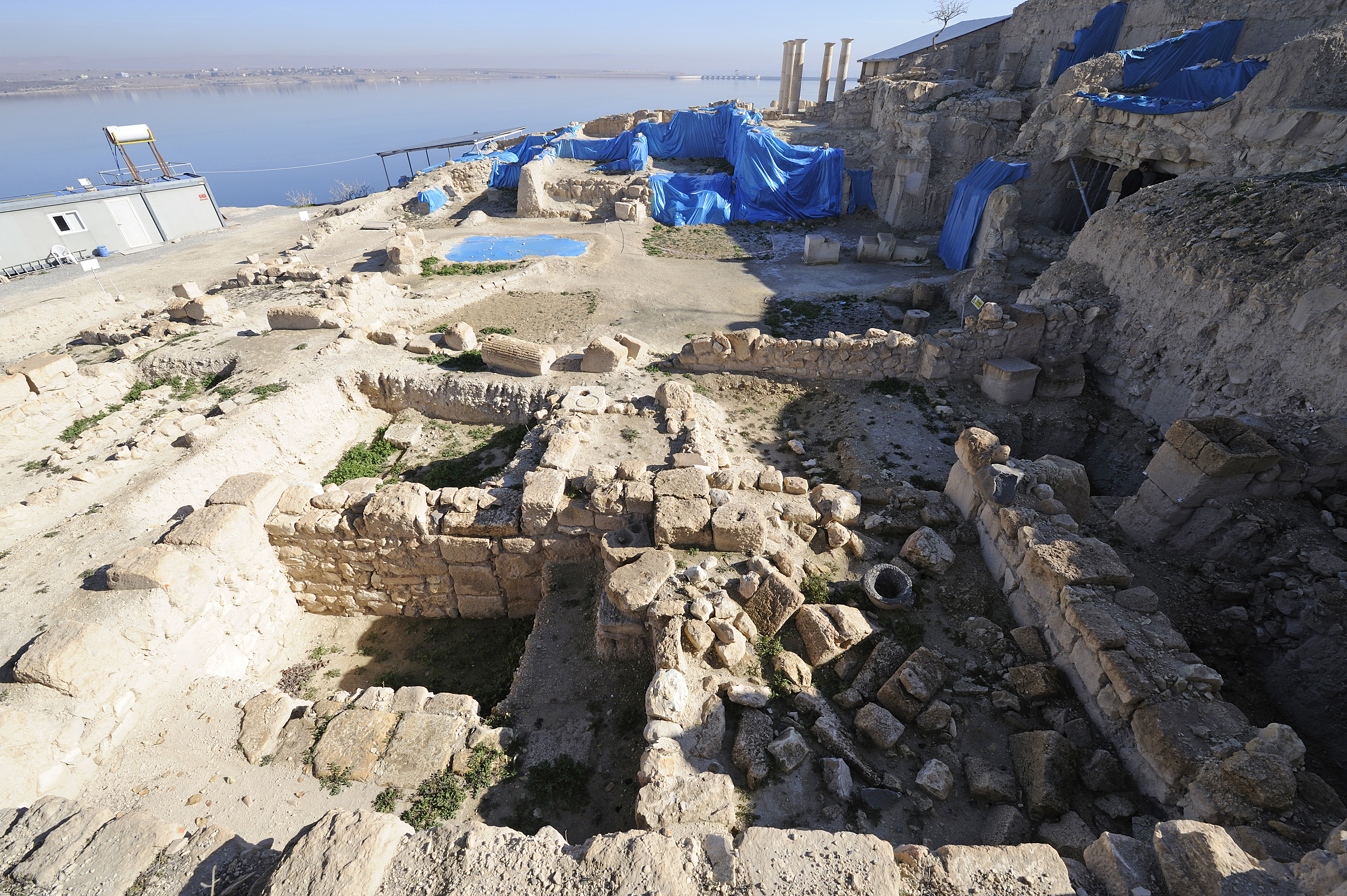
Zeugma excavations

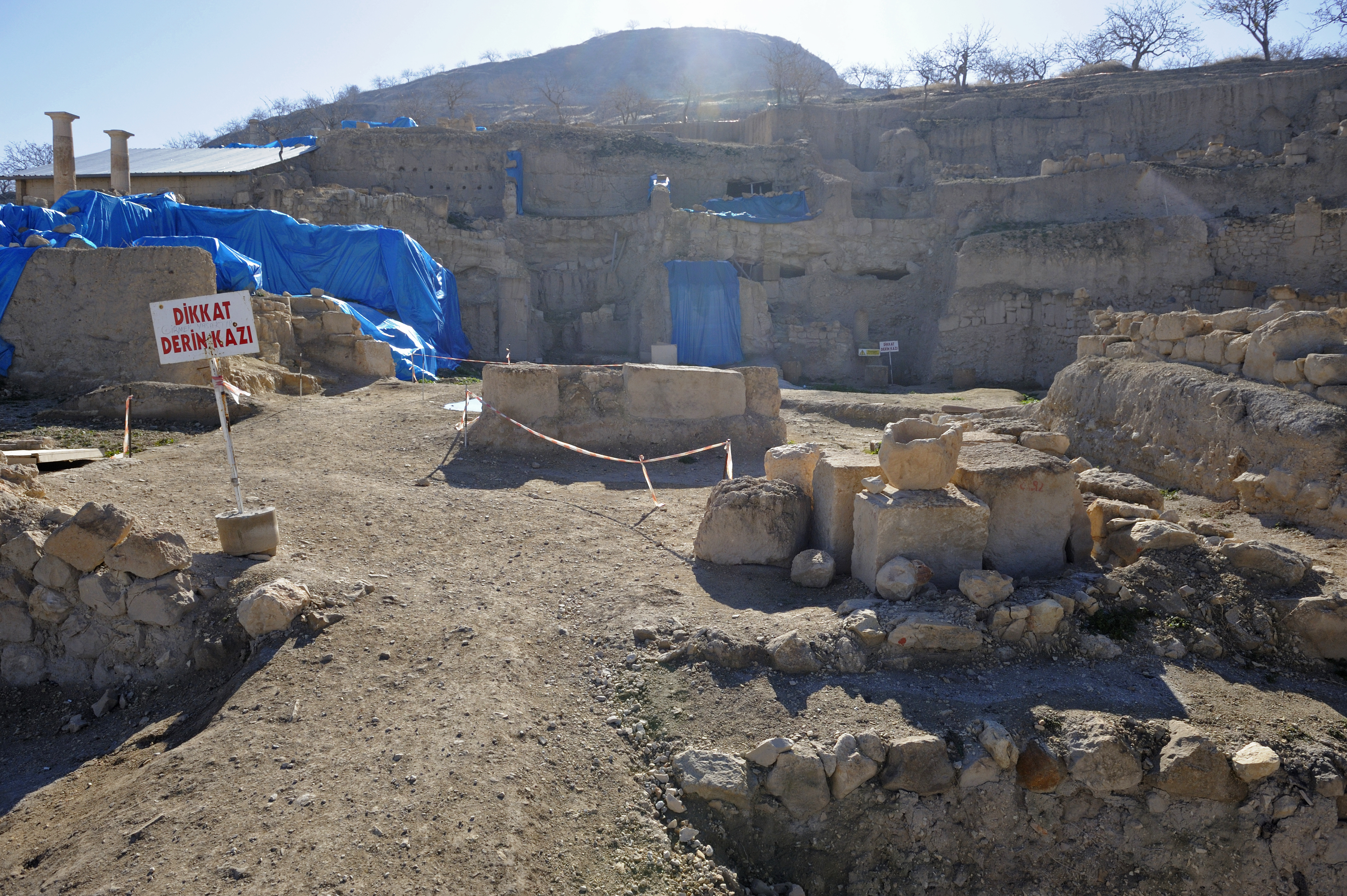
Zeugma excavations

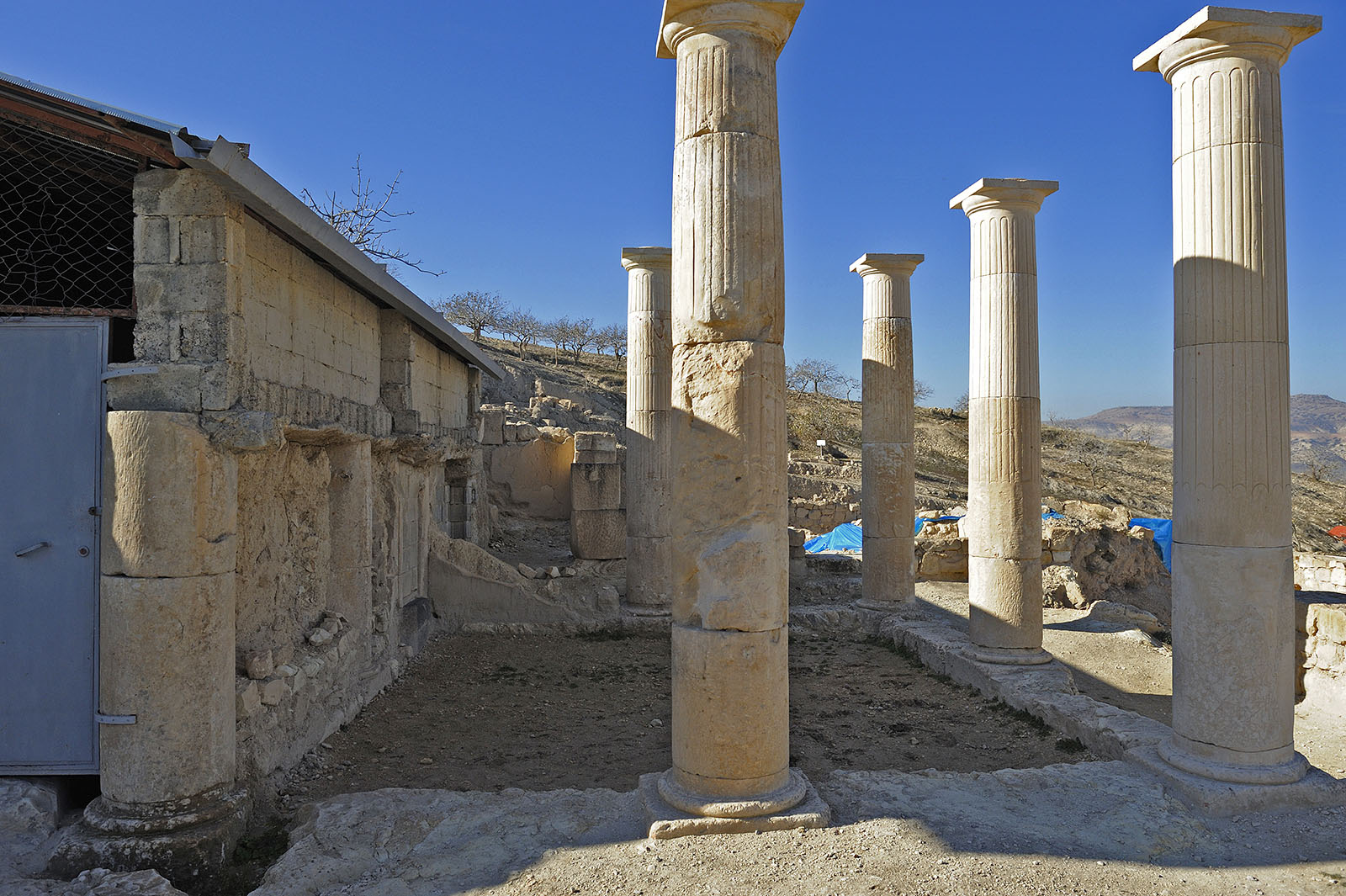
Zeugma excavations

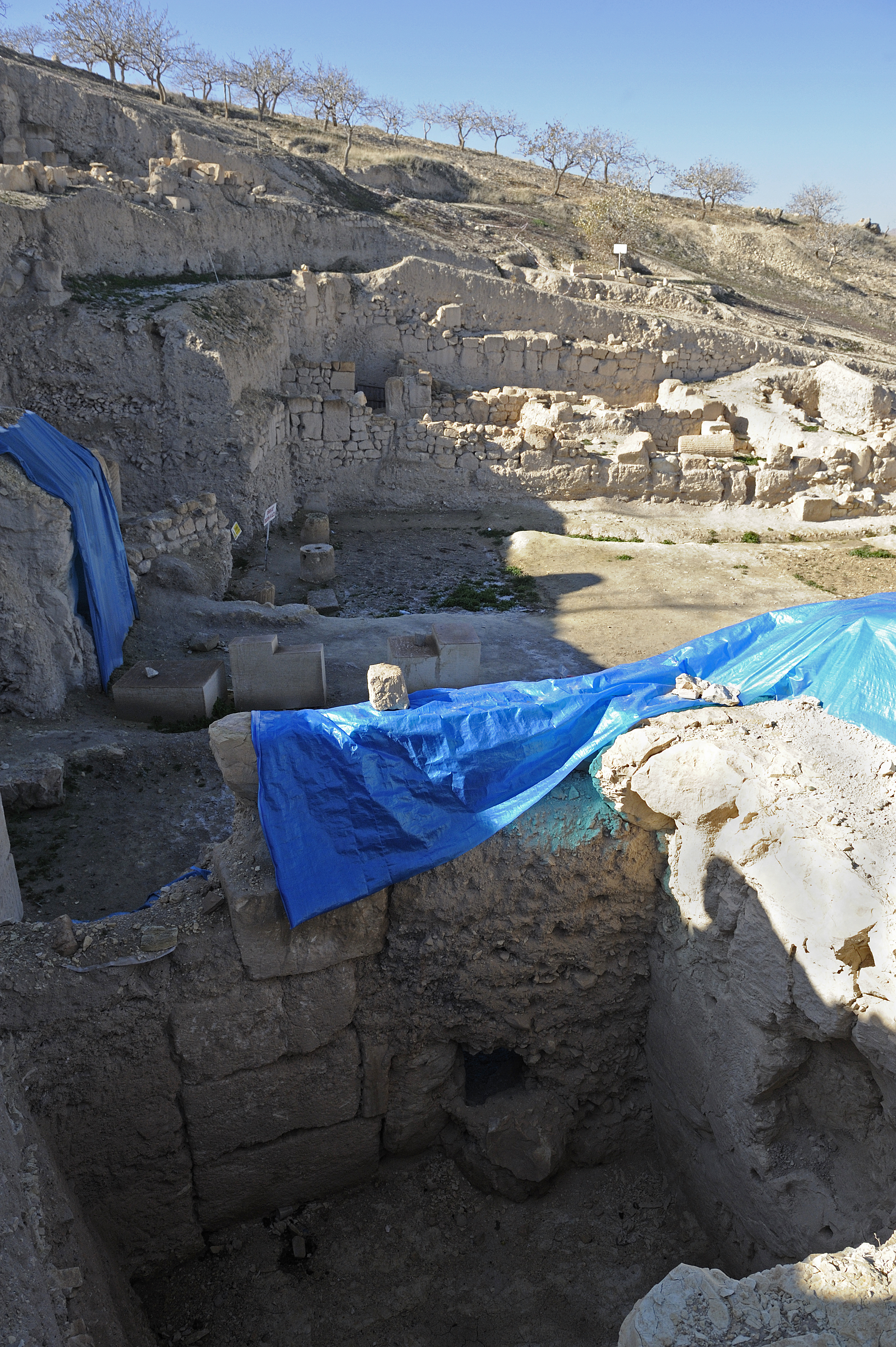
Zeugma excavations

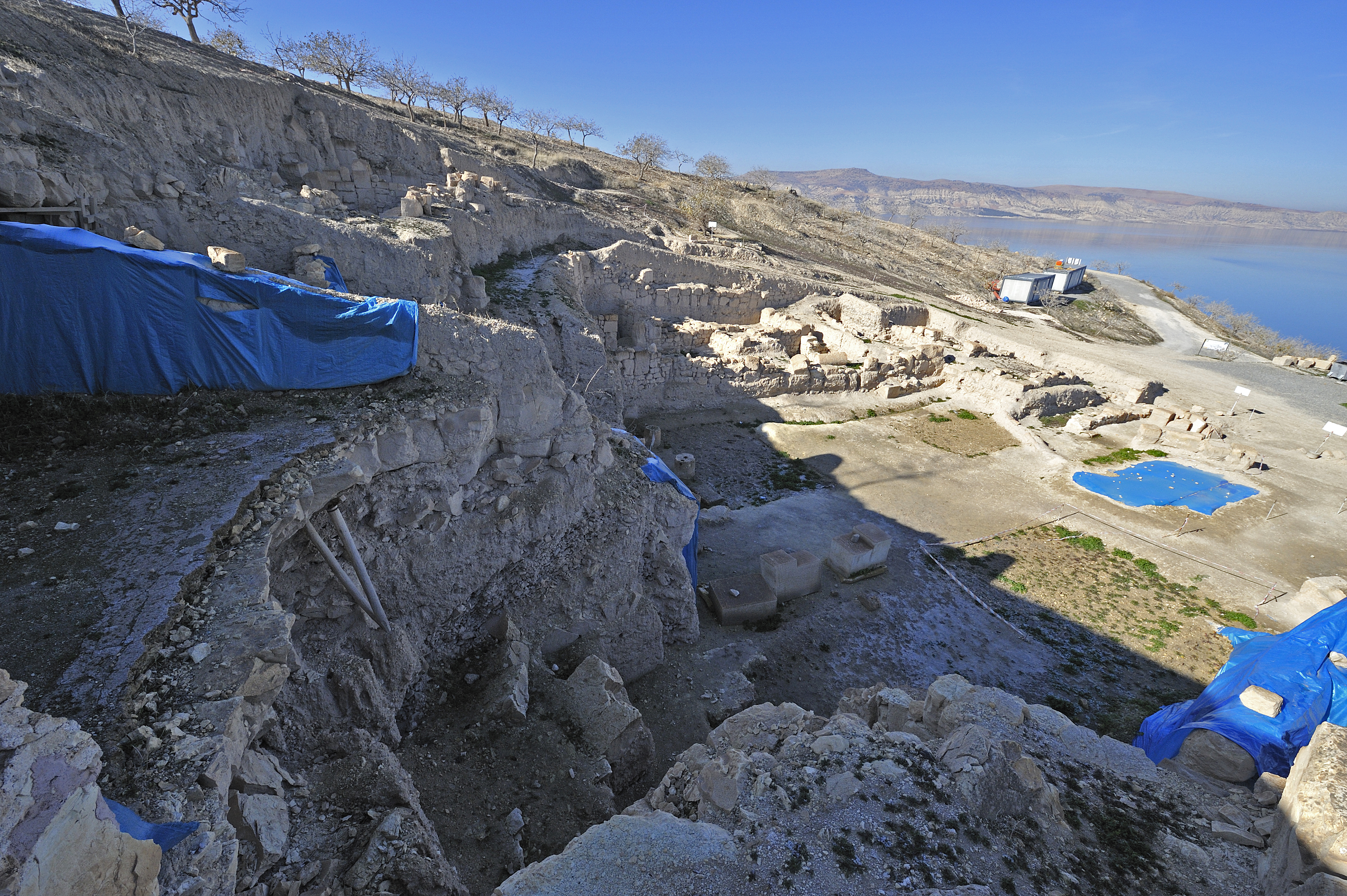
Zeugma excavations

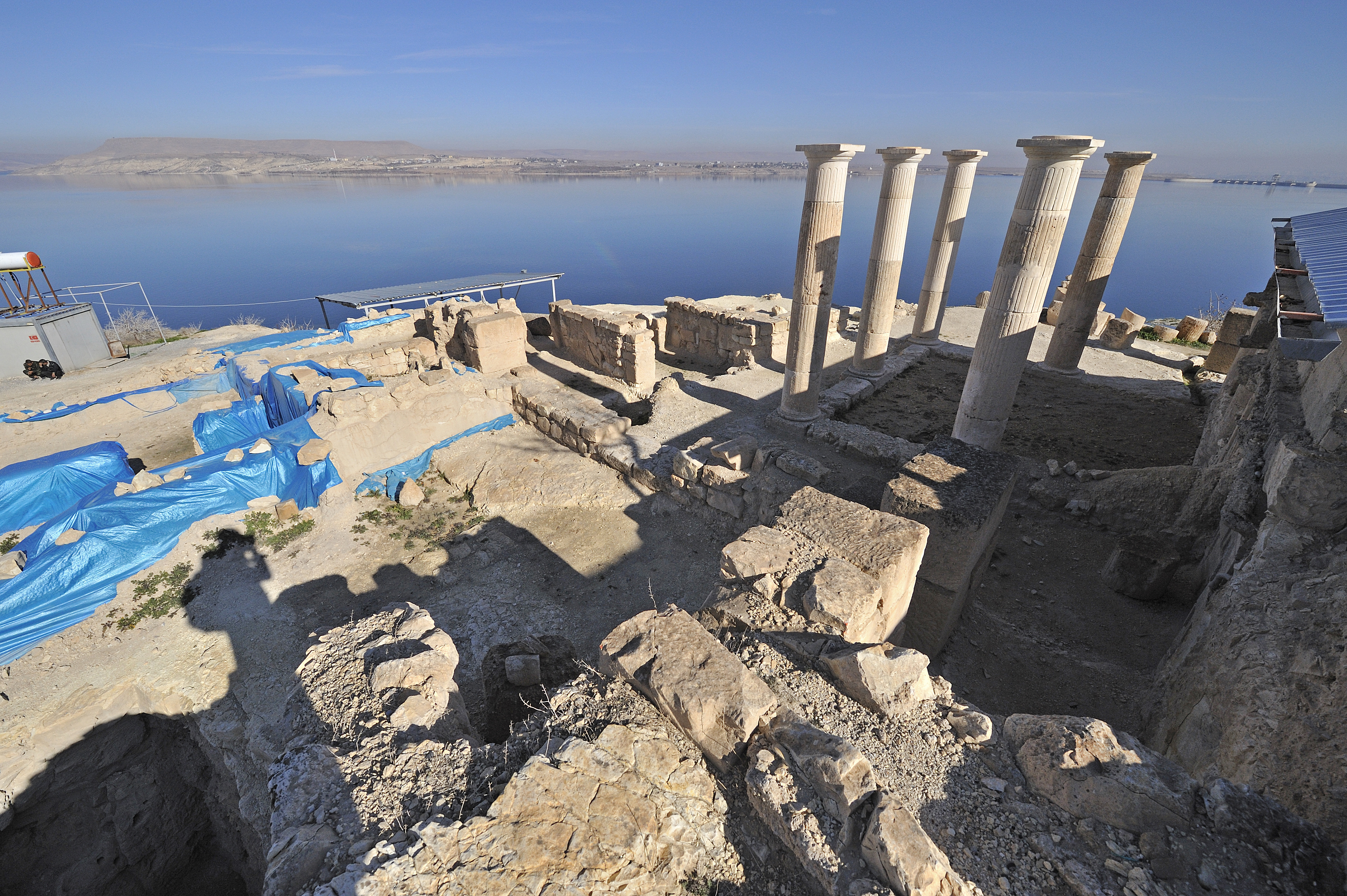
Zeugma excavations

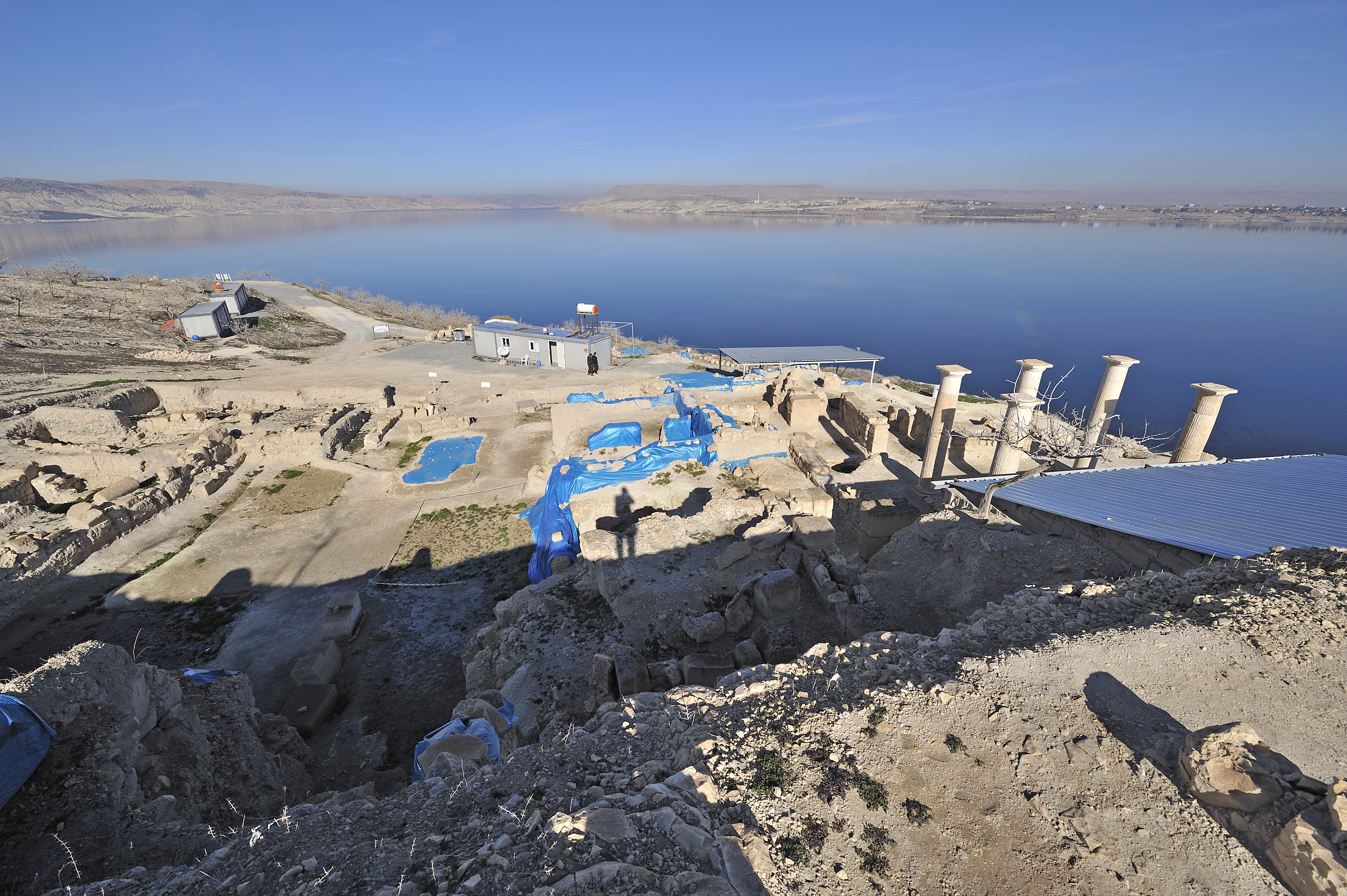
Zeugma excavations

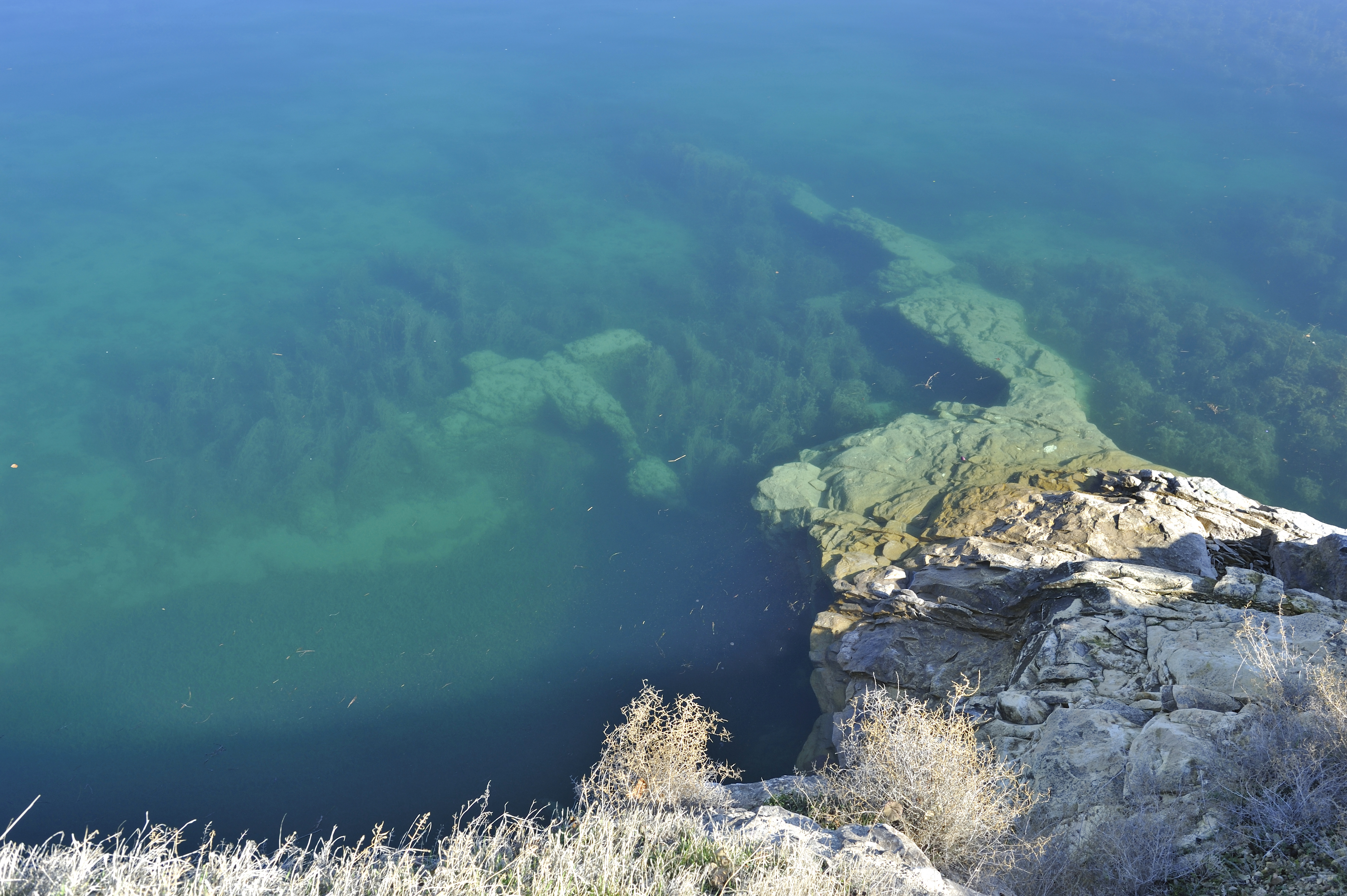
Zeugma excavations

== See also ==
- Birecik Dam Cemetery
- Seleucia at the Zeugma
- Hasankeyf
