= Acratopotes =

Ancient Greek mythological figure

In Greek mythology, Acratopotes (Ancient Greek: Ἀκρατοπότης), the drinker of unmixed (as in not diluted with water) wine, was a hero worshiped in Munychia in Attica. According to Pausanias, who calls him simply Acratus, he was one of the divine companions of Dionysus, who was worshiped at Attica. Pausanias saw his image at Athens in the house of Polytion, where it was fixed in the wall.
