= Çayan =

Çayan can refer to:

- Çayan, Göynücek, a village in Amasya Province, Turkey
- Çayan, Sungurlu, a village in Çorum Province, Turkey
- Mahir Çayan (1946–1972), Turkish Communist leader

== See also ==
- Cayan
- Çayönü
- Chayan (disambiguation)
