= Schaikewitz =

Schaikewitz is an Ashkenazi Jewish surname. It is an East-Slavic-style patronymic derivation from the given name Shaike. Notable people with the surname include:

- Nahum Meir Schaikewitz (1849–1905, Yiddish and Hebrew novelist and playwright.
- Mia Schaikewitz (born 1978), American TV personality and spokesperson for disability advocacy

== See also ==
- Szajewicz, Shayevich; surnames derived from another diminutive, Shaya
