= Chaya =

Chaya may refer to:

== Places ==
- Chaya (Ob), in Tomsk Oblast, Russia, a tributary of Ob River
- Chaya (Lena), in Siberia, Russia, a tributary of Lena River
- Chaya, another name for the Chepelare, a river in Bulgaria
- Chaya County, in Tibet
- Chaya, Afghanistan, a place in Afghanistan

== People ==
=== Surname ===
- Chaya family, a wealthy family of textile merchants based in Kyoto, Japan from the 16th century into the Edo period
  - Chaya Shirōjirō, merchants within that family, wealthy and influential traders with the official patronage of the Tokugawa shogunate
- Afif Chaya (born 1947), Lebanese singer and actor
- B. R. Chaya, Indian playback singer
- Maxime Chaya (born 1961), Lebanese sportsman and explorer

=== Given name ===
- Chaya (Hebrew given name), including a list of people bearing that name
- Chaya Singh (born 1981), Indian actress

== Other uses ==
- Chaya (literature), an ancient tradition of providing Sanskrit glosses (transliterations) for Prakrit word forms, particularly in classical Indian drama plays
- Chaya (plant), a vegetable
- Chaya tequila, a brand of tequila
- Chayah (heb. חיה literally "life"), in Judaism a term for soul, considered a part of Hashem (God)
- Chaya (film), a Kannada-language film
- Chaya, a 1971 horror novel by Indian writer Narayan Dharap

== See also ==
- Chhaya (disambiguation)
- Shaya (disambiguation)
- Ochaya (茶屋), "teahouse," a Japanese euphemism for traditional drinking establishments of the early modern period
