= Chayan =

Chayan (Persian: چايان) may refer to:

== Places ==
- Chayan, Bahar, a village in Bahar County, Hamadan Province, Iran
- Chayan, Razan, a village in Razan County, Hamadan Province, Iran

== People ==
- Gerardo Alvarez-Vazquez, Mexican drug trafficker known as El Chayán
- Mamunur Rahman Chayan, Bangladeshi field hockey player

== Other uses ==
- "Chayan" (चयन), an essay by Suryakant Tripathi (1897–1961)

== See also ==
- Çayan (disambiguation)
- Chhaya (disambiguation)
- Cayan, American payment processing company
- Chayanne, Puerto Rican singer, dancer and actor
