= Tchicaya =

Tchicaya or Thystère Tchicaya is a surname. Notable people with this surname include:

- Tchicaya U Tam'si (1931 – 1988), Congolese author, born Gérald-Félix Tchicaya
- Jean-Félix Tchicaya (1903 – 1961), Congolese politician in the French colony of Middle Congo
- Jean-Pierre Thystère Tchicaya (1936 – 2008), Congolese politician
- Jean-Marc Thystère Tchicaya (born 1964), Congolese politician
- Thibault Tchicaya (born 1983), Gabon international footballer

== See also ==
- Tchicaya U Tam'si Prize for African Poetry, established in 1989
- Chaya (disambiguation)
- Chica (disambiguation)
