= Nemrik 9 =

Archaeological site in Iraq

- Location within Iraq
- 36.716667°N 42.85°E
- Type: Tell
- Periods: Khiamian, PPNA, PPNB
- Location: Iraq, Iraqi Kurdistan
- Region: Dohuk Governorate

History
- Built: c. 9800 BC
- Abandoned: c. 8270 BC

Site notes
- Material: Mudbrick
- Area: 1.8 hectares (18,000 m^{2})
- Excavation dates: 1985–1987
- Archaeologists: Stefan Karol Kozlowski; Karol Szymczak

Nemrik 9 is an early Neolithic archeological site dated to c. 9800-8270 BC (Pre-Pottery Neolithic A), in the Dohuk Governorate in the north of modern-day Iraq.

== Site ==
The site covers an area of approximately 1.8 hectares (18,000 m^{2}) and was excavated between 1985 and 1989 on behalf of the Polish Centre of Mediterranean Archaeology University of Warsaw by Stefan Karol Kozlowski and Karol Szymczak (University of Warsaw) as part of the Eski Mosul (Saddam Dam) Salvage Project. It is located on a terrace of the Tigris near the Kurdish Mountains and sits at an altitude of 345 metres (1,132 ft) above sea level.

== Material culture ==
Numerous rounded buildings were found along with evidence of communal courtyards. Buildings featured post holes and benches with walls that were made of mudbrick and plastered with clay. Several graves were found containing anything from skull fragments to full skeletons. Stone tools found at the site included pestles, mortars, quern-stones, grinders, axes and polishing stones. Some rare examples of worked stone were discovered including one piece made from marble. Some decorative adornments were also found, including beads, pendants, shell and bone ornaments. Some stone and clay art objects were recovered in the shapes of heads and animals; these included a series of sixteen bird heads.

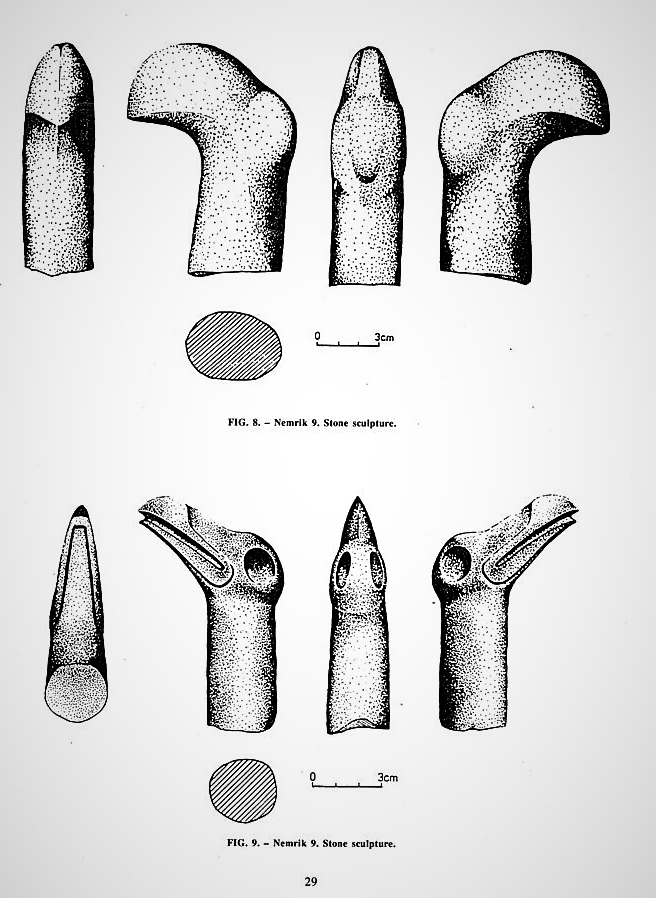
Nemrik polished stone representations of diurnal birds of prey, circa 9000 BC

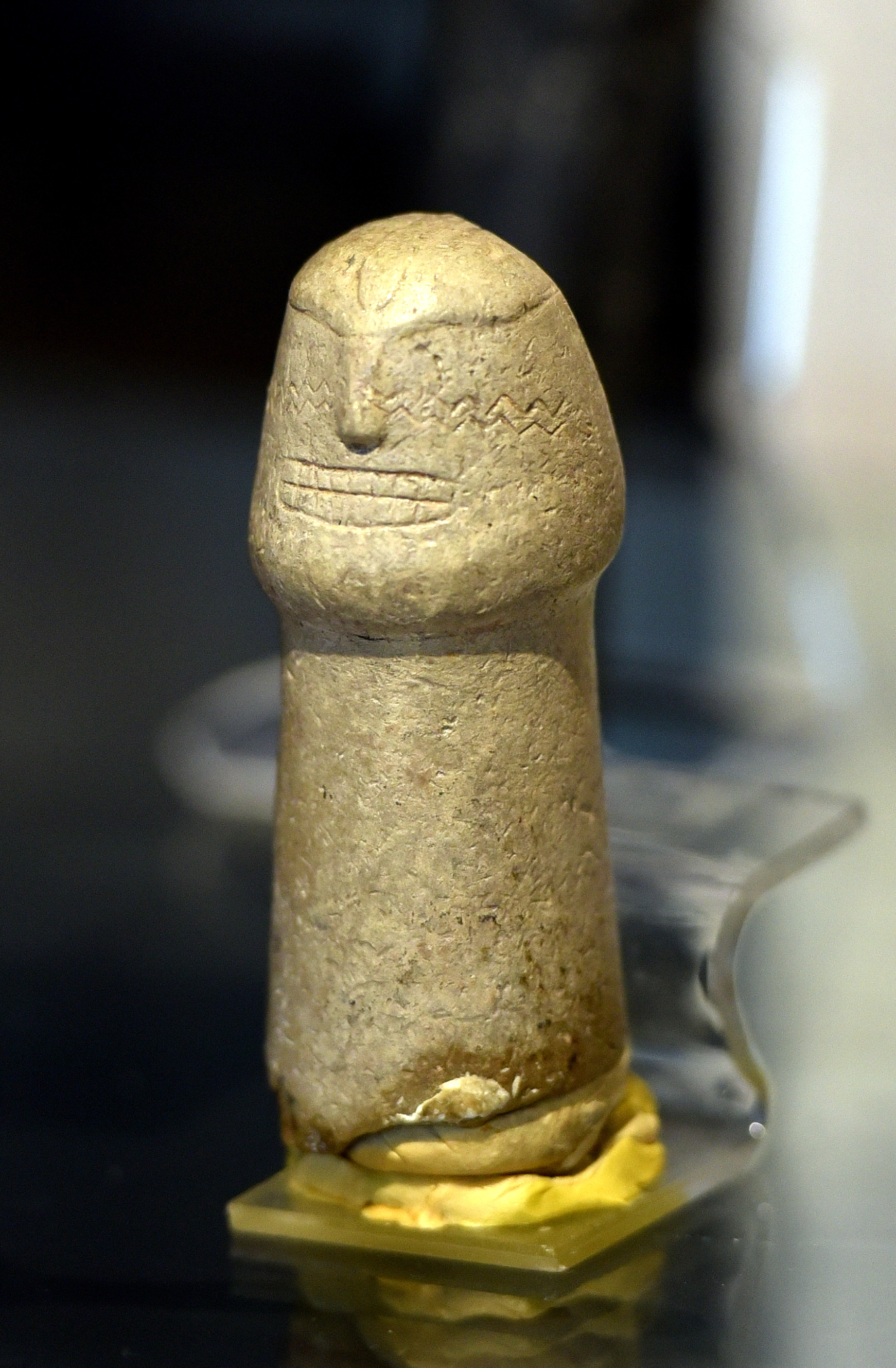
Phallic sculpture with engraved human figure. Nemrik - Iraq (7800–6500 BC, Pre-Pottery Neolithic B). National Museum of Iraq - Baghdad.

== Fauna ==
Faunal analysis was carried out by A. Lasota-Moskalewska and found relatively few remains from domestic sheep, goats, pigs and cattle. Other bones found included various antelope, jackal, deer, boar, badger, and horse. Some snail shells were found that were also considered to be a food source. There was also evidence of panther and Indian buffalo. Plant remains at the site were floated by Mark Nesbitt and indicated evidence for bitter vetch, pea and lentil, the domestication of which was not determined. The site was well situated between the two terrain types of grassy steppe and forest and is considered of key importance for research into village structures in the Pre-Pottery Neolithic A stage.

== Genetics ==
Bronze Age samples and locations and dates of Mesopotamia_Neolithic ancestry: Nemrik 9 (9500-8000 BC), Boncuklu (9000-8500 BC), Çayönü (8300-7500 BC).

Human samples from Nemrik dated to circa 9500-8000 BCE were part of a recent genetic study, as members of a Mesopotamia_Neolithic cluster (together with Çayönü and Boncuklu samples). In this study, the Mesopotamia_Neolithic cluster appeared as a major ancestry of several Levantine and Egyptian Bronze Age individuals, particularly from Ebla, Ashkalon, Baq'ah and Nuwayrat.

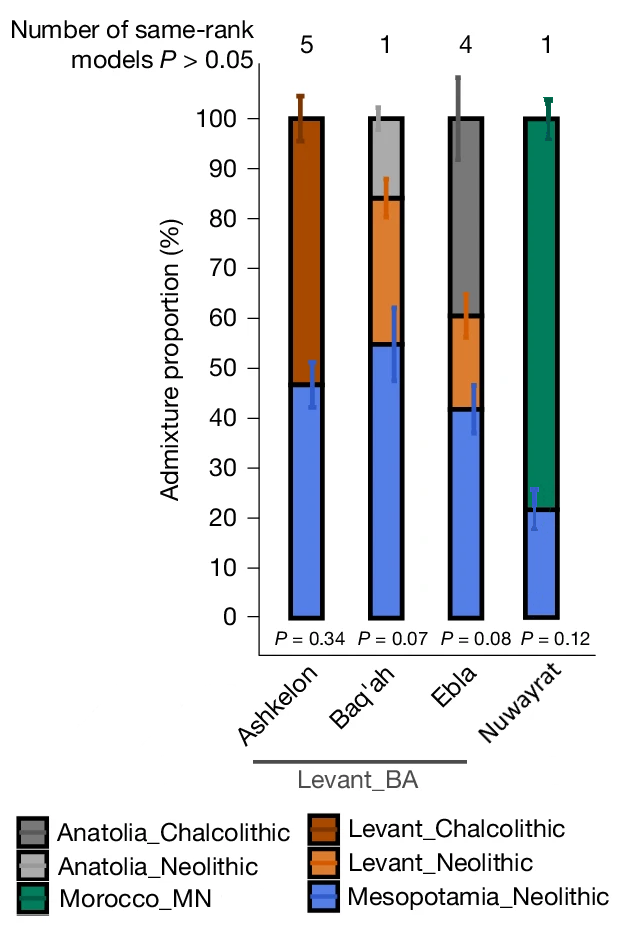
Ancestry proportions of Ascalon, Ebla, Baq'ah and Nuwayrat Bronze Age samples for the best-fit full model (qpAdm).

The Nuwayrat individual in particular, an Old Kingdom adult male Egyptian of relatively high-status radiocarbon-dated to 2855–2570 BCE and dubbed "Old Kingdom individual (NUE001)", was found to be associated with North African Neolithic ancestry, but about 24% of his genetic ancestry could be sourced to the eastern Fertile Crescent, including Mesopotamia, corresponding to the Mesopotamia_Neolithic cluster. The genetic profile was most closely represented by a two-source model, in which 77.6% ± 3.8% of the ancestry corresponded to genomes from the Middle Neolithic Moroccan site of Skhirat-Rouazi (dated to 4780–4230 BCE), which itself consists of predominantly (76.4 ± 4.0%) Levant Neolithic ancestry and (23.6 ± 4.0%) minor Iberomaurusian ancestry, while the remainder (22.4% ± 3.8%) was most closely related to known genomes from Neolithic Mesopotamia (dated to 9000-8000 BCE). No other two-source model met the significance criteria (P>0.05). A total of two Three-source models also emerged, but had similar ancestry proportions, with the addition of a much smaller third-place component from the Neolithic/Chalcolithic Levant. According to Lazardis, “What this sample does tell us is that at such an early date there were people in Egypt that were mostly North African in ancestry, but with some contribution of ancestry from Mesopotamia". According to Girdland-Flink, the fact that 20% of the man’s ancestry best matches older genomes from Mesopotamia, suggests that the movement of Mesopotamian people into Egypt may have been fairly substantial at some point.

The timing of the admixture event cannot be calculated directly from the 2025 genetic study. The 2025 study showed that the Nuwayrat sample had the greatest affinity with samples from Neolithic Mesopotamia dating to 9000-8000 BCE. Concurrently, other studies have shown that during the Neolithic, in the 10,000-5,000 BCE period, populations from Mesopotamia and the Zagros expanded into the Near-East, particularly Anatolia, bringing with them the Neolithic package of technological innovation (domesticated plants, pottery, greater sedentism). Egypt may also have been affected by such migratory movements. Further changes in odontometrics and dental tissues have been observed in the Nile Valley around 6000 BCE. Subsequent cultural influxes from Mesopotamia are documented into the 4th millennium (3999-3000 BCE) with the appearance of Late Uruk features during the Late Pre-dynastic period of Egypt.

== Sources ==
- Morez Jacobs, Adeline; Irish, Joel D.; Cooke, Ashley; Anastasiadou, Kyriaki; Barrington, Christopher; Gilardet, Alexandre; Kelly, Monica; Silva, Marina; Speidel, Leo; Tait, Frankie; Williams, Mia; Brucato, Nicolas; Ricaut, Francois-Xavier; Wilkinson, Caroline; Madgwick, Richard; Holt, Emily; Nederbragt, Alexandra J.; Inglis, Edward; Hajdinjak, Mateja; Skoglund, Pontus; Girdland-Flink, Linus (2 July 2025). "Whole-genome ancestry of an Old Kingdom Egyptian". Nature: 1–8. doi:10.1038/s41586-025-09195-5. ISSN 1476-4687. PMC 12367555. PMID 40604286.
