= Chhaya (disambiguation) =

Chhaya is the Hindu goddess of shadow.

Chhaya may also refer to:

- Chhaya, India, a city in the state of Gujarat, India
- Chhaya (film), a 1961 Indian Hindi-language film
- Chhaya Devi (1914–2001), Indian film actress
- Chhaya Kadam (1975–present) actress

== See also ==
- Chaya (disambiguation)
- Chayan (disambiguation)
- Chhayanat (disambiguation)
