= Old Kingdom Individual (NUE001) =

Egyptian skeleton

NUE001
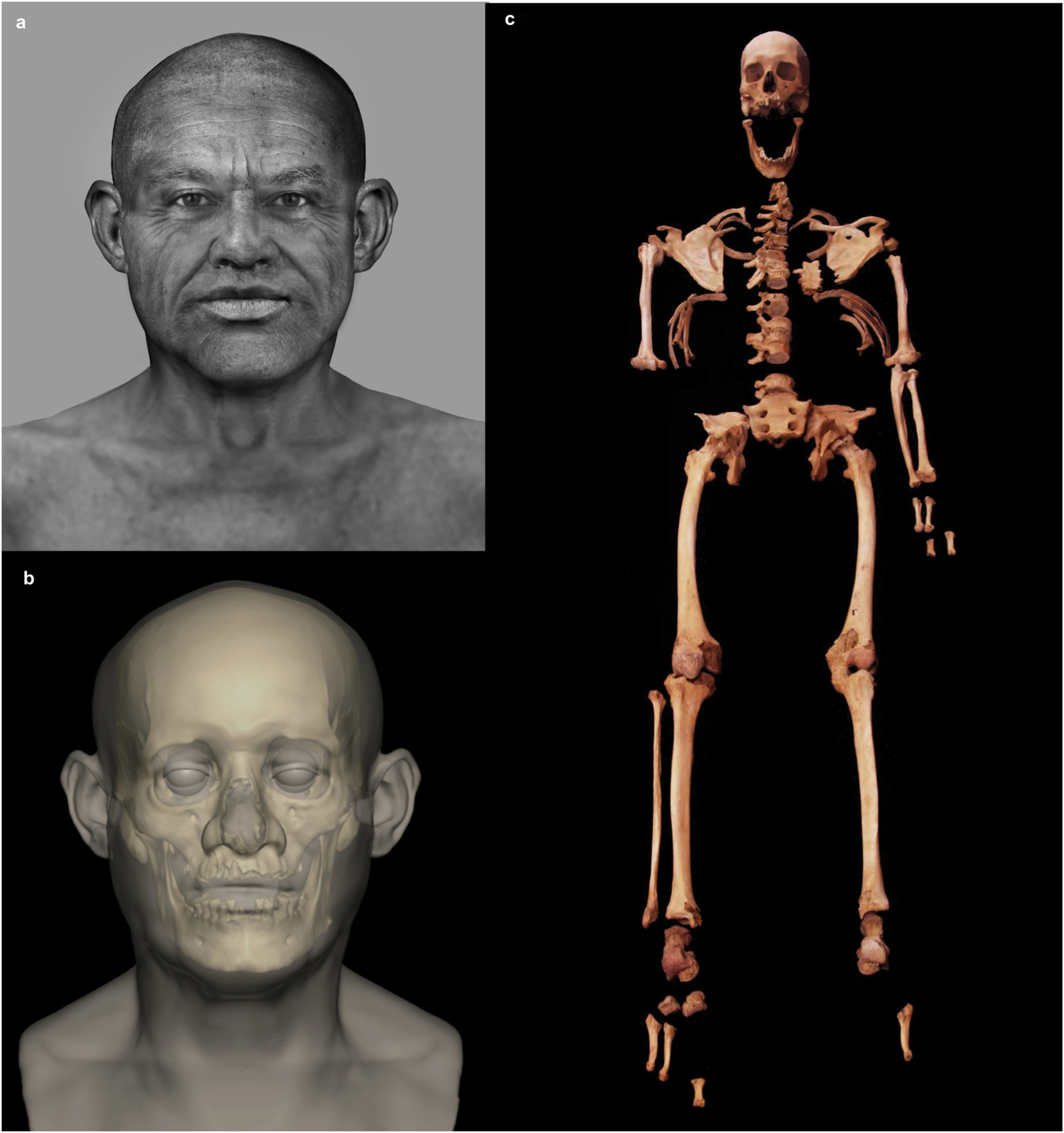
- Facial reconstruction and depiction created from the Nuwayrat individual skull
- Resting place: World Museum, England, United Kingdom

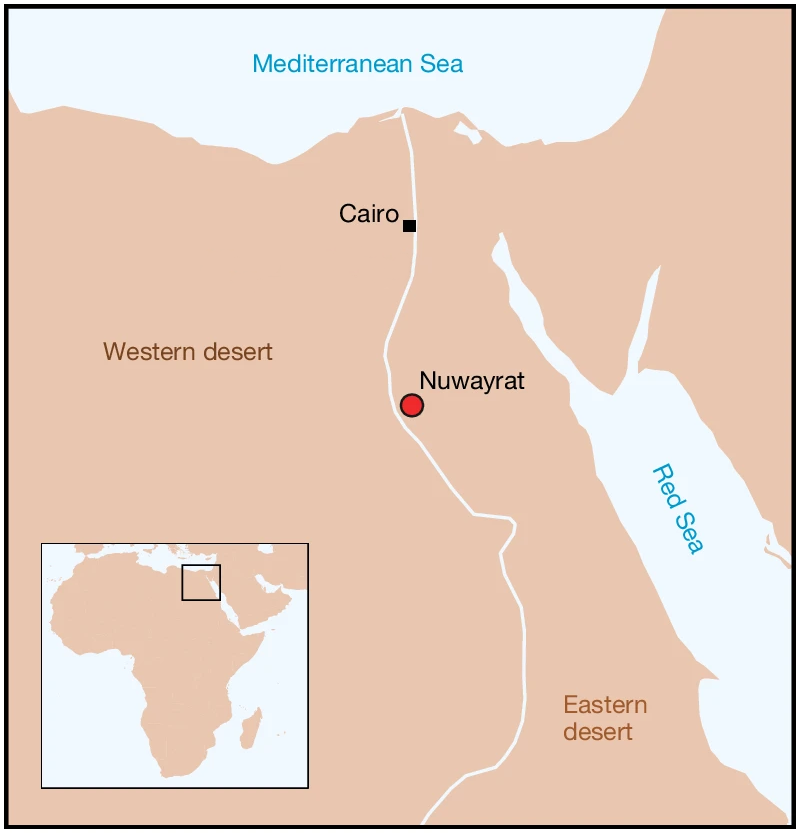
Location of Nuwayrat

NUE001 is the genetic code name of an Old Kingdom adult male Egyptian of relatively high-status who was excavated in a cliff in Nuwayrat, Minya (Nuerat, نويرات), 265 km south of Cairo, and whose whole-genome ancestry was published in 2025 in an article in the journal Nature. The individual was radiocarbon-dated to 2855–2570 BC, between the Early Dynastic period and Fourth Dynasty, with the funerary practices and related artifacts of the tomb being archeologically attributed to the Third and Fourth Dynasty.

NUE001 is remarkable in that it represents the first successfully sequenced Early Dynastic Egyptian to date, and for the resulting discovery that around 20% of his genetic ancestry can be traced to the Eastern Fertile Crescent, including Mesopotamia, which suggests early human migrations from Mesopotamia to Egypt, in addition to the already known cultural flows starting from at least the 6th millennium BC.

== Study ==
For the first time in 2025, a study was able to give insights into the genetic background of Early Dynastic Egyptians, by sequencing the whole genome of an Old Kingdom adult male Egyptian of relatively high-status, radiocarbon-dated to 2855–2570 BC, with funerary practices archeologically attributed to the Third and Fourth Dynasty, which was excavated in Nuwayrat (Nuerat, نويرات), in a cliff 265 km south of Cairo.

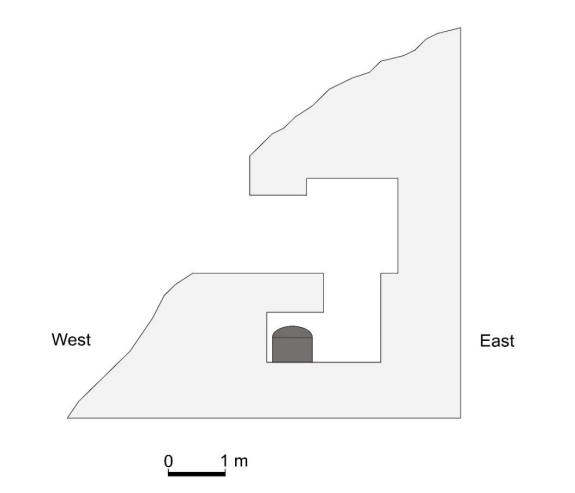
Tomb plan with pottery coffin

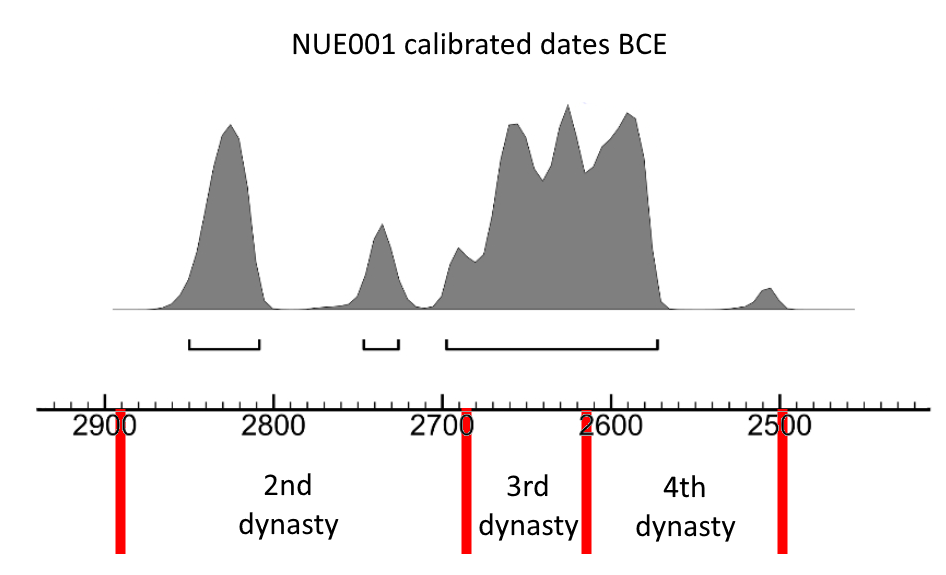
Calibrated Carbon-14 dates of NUE001, in relation to historical dynasties

Before this study, whole-genome sequencing of Ancient Egyptians from the earliest periods of Egyptian Dynastic history had not yet been accomplished, primarily because of the unforgiving DNA preservation conditions in Egypt. Although previous archaeogenetic research had managed to study the partial DNA of ancient Egyptian individuals from 1388 BC to 426 AD, only three of the samples had acceptable nuclear contamination rates; two from the Pre-Ptolemaic Period (New Kingdom to Late Period), and one from the Ptolemaic Period. These samples were dated to millennia after the Old Kingdom period, well after Egypt had experienced multiple pivotal upheavals, which may or may not have resulted in substantial genetic turnover within the Egyptian population. As a result, the genetic structure of Early-Dynastic Ancient Egyptians remained unclear.

The body was initially excavated in 1902 and stored in the World Museum in Liverpool, where it survived the bombings during the Blitz in World War 2, until samplings were made for the 2025 study. The discoverer, John Garstang of the University of Liverpool, published a short account of the discovery in The burial customs of ancient Egypt as illustrated by tombs of the Middle Kingdom; being a report of excavations made in the necropolis of Beni Hassan during 1902-3-4 (pp. 26–28).

== Genomic analysis ==
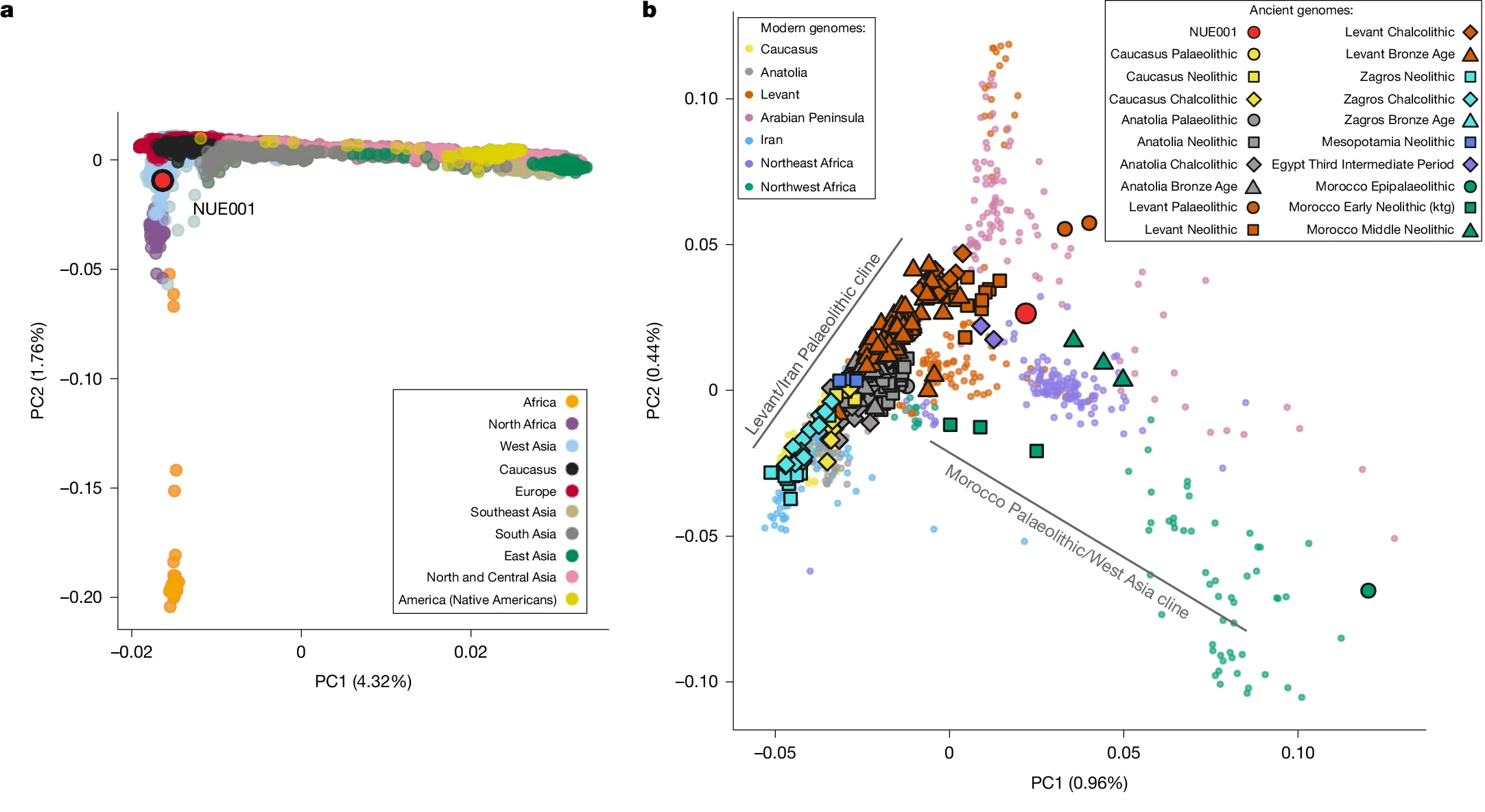
Genetic ancestry of the Nuwayrat genome ●: a) PCA of present-day worldwide populations, with projection of the Old Kingdom Egyptian genome from Nuwayrat (NUE001). b) PCA of present-day populations from North Africa and West Asia, with projection of ancient North African and West Asian genomes

The corpse had been placed intact in a large circular clay pot without embalming or mummification, which were not standard practice at the time, and then installed inside a cliff tomb, which accounts for the comparatively good level of conservation of the skeleton and its DNA. This special mortuary treatment suggests that the individual had a relatively higher social status. However, his skeleton revealed important musculoskeletal stress suggesting intense physical labor, with characteristics possibly consistent with the professional activity of a potter.

The DNA was extracted from the cementum at the root of a tooth, an excellent source for DNA preservation. Shotgun sequencing was used, giving full coverage across the whole genome.

=== Main findings ===
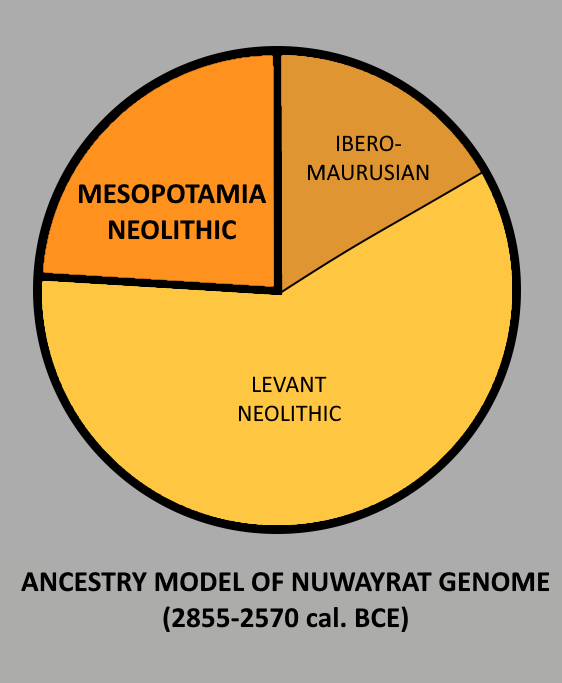
Ancestry model of Egyptian genome from Nuwayrat

The study found that "the Nuwayrat individual is genetically most similar to present-day people in North Africa and West Asia"

The genetic profile of the Nuwayrat individual was most closely represented by a two-source model, in which 77.6% ± 3.8% of the ancestry corresponded to genomes from the Middle Neolithic Moroccan site of Skhirat-Rouazi (SKH, dated to 4780–4230 BC), itself consisting of predominantly (76.4 ± 4%) Levant Neolithic ancestry and (23.6 ± 4%) minor Iberomaurusian ancestry, with the remaining (22.4% ± 3.8%) most closely related to known genomes from Neolithic Mesopotamia (dated to 9000-8000 BC). No other two-source model met the significance criteria (P>0.05). Two Three-source models were also consistent with the data, consisting of similar ancestry proportions, with the addition of a smaller direct contribution from populations of the Chalcolithic Levant.

Ancestry modelling of ancient East African genomes with qpAdm (study's Fig. 7) identified the Nuwayrat genome as an equally strong candidate for the West Eurasian-related ancestry in ancient pastoralists from Kenya and Tanzania, as populations of the Chalcolithic Levant, consistent with the results of ADMIXTURE analysis of modern East African or 1st millennium Sudan Early Christians' genomes.

The Nuwayrat individual's Y-Chromosome and Mitochondrial haplogroups were identified as E1b1b1b2b, also known as E-V1515 (Trombetta et al., 2015) and haplogroup I/N1a1b2, respectively. According to the study, "the mitochondrial DNA (haplogroup I/N1a1b2) and chromosome Y (haplogroup E1b1b1b2b~) haplogroups of the Nuwayrat individual are most common in present-day North African and West Asian groups... consistent with the whole-genome affinities."

==== Neolithic North African component (77.6% ± 3.8%) ====
Most of the genome of the Nuwayrat individual (about 78%) derived from Neolithic North African ancestry, specifically matching samples from the Moroccan site of Skhirat-Rouazi (SKH, dated to 4780–4230 BC). This seems to reflect shared Neolithic ancestry across North Africa during this period, and its specific genetic contribution to the Early Dynastic and Old Kingdom people. However this shared Neolithic North African ancestry itself has been previously shown to be a combination of Levant Neolithic ancestry for about 76%, probably reflecting one or several pre-Bronze Age Levantine migration events, and Iberomaurusian ancestry for about 24%. The two source populations of Skhirat-Rouazi (SKH) are characterized as follows:

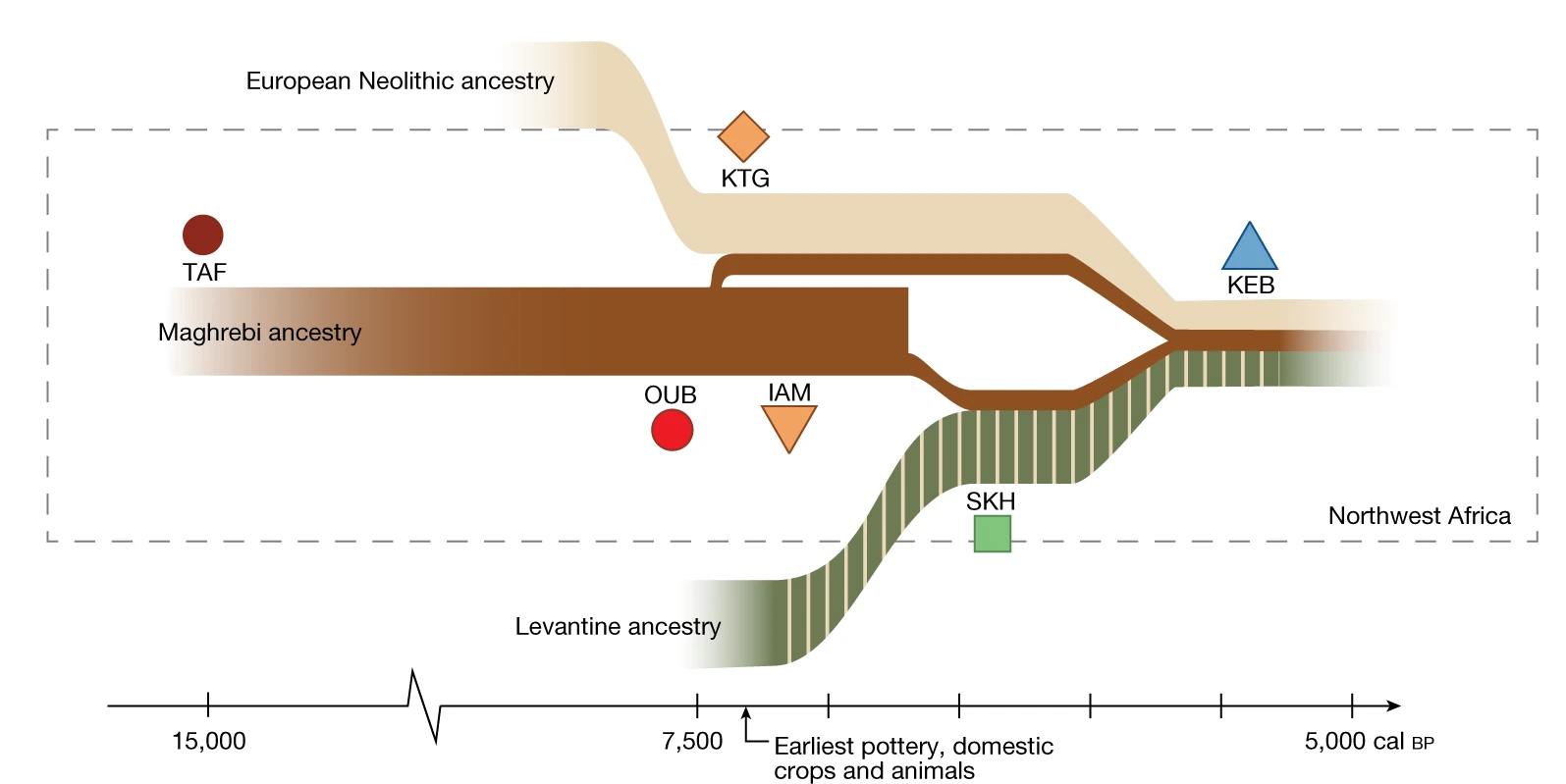
Summary of inferred population history of the Stone Age Maghreb. The Skhirat-Rouazi (SKH) branch represents a wave of Levantine migration around 5000 BC (■), with some local admixture (■).

- 1) The Iberomaurusian group (■), represented by Taforalt (TAF), going back around 15,000 years ago and whose profile persisted well into the Neolithic, represents the autochthonous Maghrebi Upper Paleolithic substrate of hunter-gatherers, whose genetic makeup was initially modelled as intermediate between contemporary Levantine foragers and sub-Saharan African populations. However, no present-day or ancient Holocene Sub-Saharan African group was found to be a good proxy for the non-Eurasian admixture component found in Taforalt individuals. Instead, Iosif Lazaridis et al. (2018) argued that this Iberomaurusian/Taforalt lineage contributed around 13% ancestry to modern West Africans "rather than Taforalt having ancestry from an unknown Sub-Saharan African source". Finally a study in 2025 by researchers from the Max Planck Institute for Evolutionary Anthropology in Leipzig discovered that the non-Eurasian ancestry found in Taforalt was from an ancestral lineage, native to North Africa that diverged there before the Out-of-Africa migration that gave rise to Eurasians, but never left Africa and became mostly isolated (both from sub-Saharan African and Eurasian groups). This North African lineage did "not carry sub-Saharan African ancestry, suggesting that, contrary to previous interpretations, the Green Sahara was not a corridor connecting Northern and sub-Saharan Africa."
- 2) The second (■) Neolithic Levantine group, a population whose principal ancestry was introduced to Northwestern Africa during the Middle Neolithic through a westward expansion of pastoralists originating in the Levant, who entered Northeast Africa via the Sinai around 6,000 BC, and who, around 5000 BC, introduced animal husbandry and a distinct pottery style to Northwest Africa. This group correlates closely with the introduction of southwest Asian domesticates such as sheep, goats, and cattle, coinciding with the rise of Saharan cattle pastoralism and the appearance of Ashakar Ware pottery in the Maghreb, and may have contributed to the early dispersal of Afro-Asiatic languages across North Africa. They admixed with Iberomaurusian groups to form the Skhirat-Rouazi (SKH) population (their genetic makeup is modelled at 76% Levant Neolithic and 24% Maghrebi).

This Skhirat-Rouazi (SKH) population is the one which is modelled as forming the bulk (~77.6%) of the ancestry of the Egyptian Old Kingdom individual from Nuwayrat NUE001.

==== Mesopotamian component (22.4 ± 3.8%) ====
Nuwayrat, together with locations and dates of the reference samples for Mesopotamia_Neolithic: Nemrik 9 (9500-8000 BC), Boncuklu Tarla (9000-8500 BC), Çayönü (8300-7500 BC)

The remaining ~22% of the Nuwayrat individual's genetic ancestry derived from Neolithic Mesopotamian-related populations, likely originating from the eastern Fertile Crescent, including Mesopotamia. The referenced "Mesopotamia_Neolithic" cluster consisted in a dozen samples from Nemrik 9 (9500-8000 BC), Boncuklu Tarla (9000-8500 BCE) and Çayönü (8300-7500 BC), all Pre-Pottery Neolithic cultures (Pre-Pottery Neolithic A or Pre-Pottery Neolithic B) located in Upper Mesopotamia and Central Mesopotamia. These sites, such as Çayönü or Boncuklu Tarla, developed from the Taş Tepeler cultural tradition of Gobekli Tepe, and a site such as Çayönü is where some of the first animal domestication occurred (the pig may have first been domesticated there in 8500 BC) and agriculture developed from the 9th millennium BC.

In a 2022 genetic study, the population of Çayönü (8300-7500 BC) was analyzed as a representative of the earliest known hunter-gatherer sedentary populations who built the monumental structure of Gobekli Tepe and domesticated various plants and animals, such as the einkorn, emmer, sheep, goats, pigs and cattle in Upper Mesopotamian. The Çayönü population was shown to be genetically diverse, carrying both western and eastern Fertile Crescent ancestry, and best modelled by an ancestry combining about 48% Anatolian Epipaleolithic (represented by EP Pınarbaşı), 33% Central Zagros Neolithic (represented by Neolithic Ganj Dareh) and 19% South Levant Neolithic components (represented by Neolithic Ayn Ghazal).

=== Historical context ===
A 2022 DNA study had already shown evidence of gene flow from the Mesopotamian and Zagros regions into surrounding areas, including Anatolia, during the Neolithic, but not as far as Egypt yet.

In terms of chronology, Egypt was one of the first areas to adopt the Neolithic package emerging from West Asia as early as the 6th millennium BC. Population genetics in the Nile Valley observed a marked change around this period, as shown by odontometric and dental tissue changes. Cultural exchange and trade between the two regions then continued through the 4th millennium BC, as shown by the transfer of Mesopotamian Late Uruk period features to the Nile Valley of the later Predynastic Period. Migrations flows from Mesopotamia accompanied such cultural exchanges, possibly through the sea routes of the Mediterranean and the Red Sea or through yet un-sampled intermediaries in the Levant, which could explain the relative smallness of genetic influence from known Chalcolithic/Bronze Age Levantines populations. According to the DNA analysis, the Mesopotamian genetic contribution to Egypt was essentially direct, and was not a secondary effect of the Mesopotamian expansion in the Levant.

The analysis also excluded any substantial ancestry in the Nuwayrat genome related to a previously published 4,500-year-old hunter-gatherer genome from the Mota cave in Ethiopia, or other individuals in central, eastern, or southern Africa.

=== Phenotype ===
The Nuwayrat individual is predicted to have had brown eyes, brown hair, and skin pigmentation ranging from dark to black. The further osteological examination revealed that he would have stood 157.4–160.5 cm tall. These physical features are broadly consistent with those observed among present-day Egyptians and North Africans.

The authors acknowledged limitations to the study, such as the reliance on a single Egyptian genome and the limited accuracy of phenotypic predictions in understudied populations. For reference, the HIrisPlex-S phenotype analysis featured in the study established probabilities for various eye, hair and skin colours as follows: for the eyes, ~98.79% for brown, ~1.19% for intermediate and ~0.02% for blue; for the hair, ~52.89% for black, ~0.14% for red, ~45.04% for brown and ~1.92% for blond; for the skin, ~37.84% for dark to black, ~56.78% for dark, ~5.28% for intermediate and ~0.1% for pale.

Regarding the supplemental facial reconstruction, the researchers noted that while the DNA analysis is indicative of population origin, there is no definitive data for skin colour, eye colour or hair colour; therefore, the reconstruction was produced in black and white without head hair or facial hair.

=== Timing and modalities of Mesopotamian migration to Egypt ===
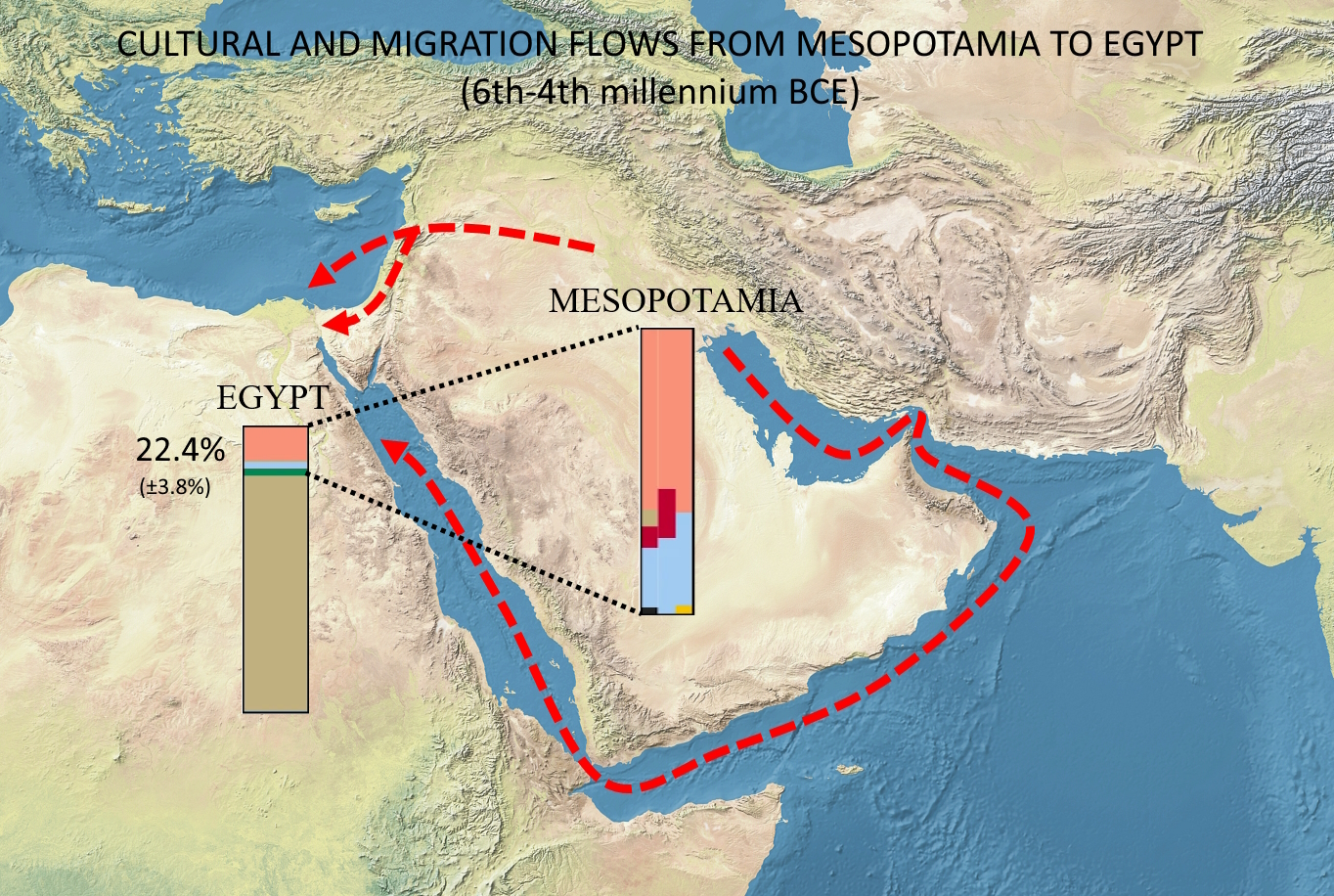
Cultural and migration flows from Mesopotamia to Egypt, with genetic contribution (6th-4th millennium BC)

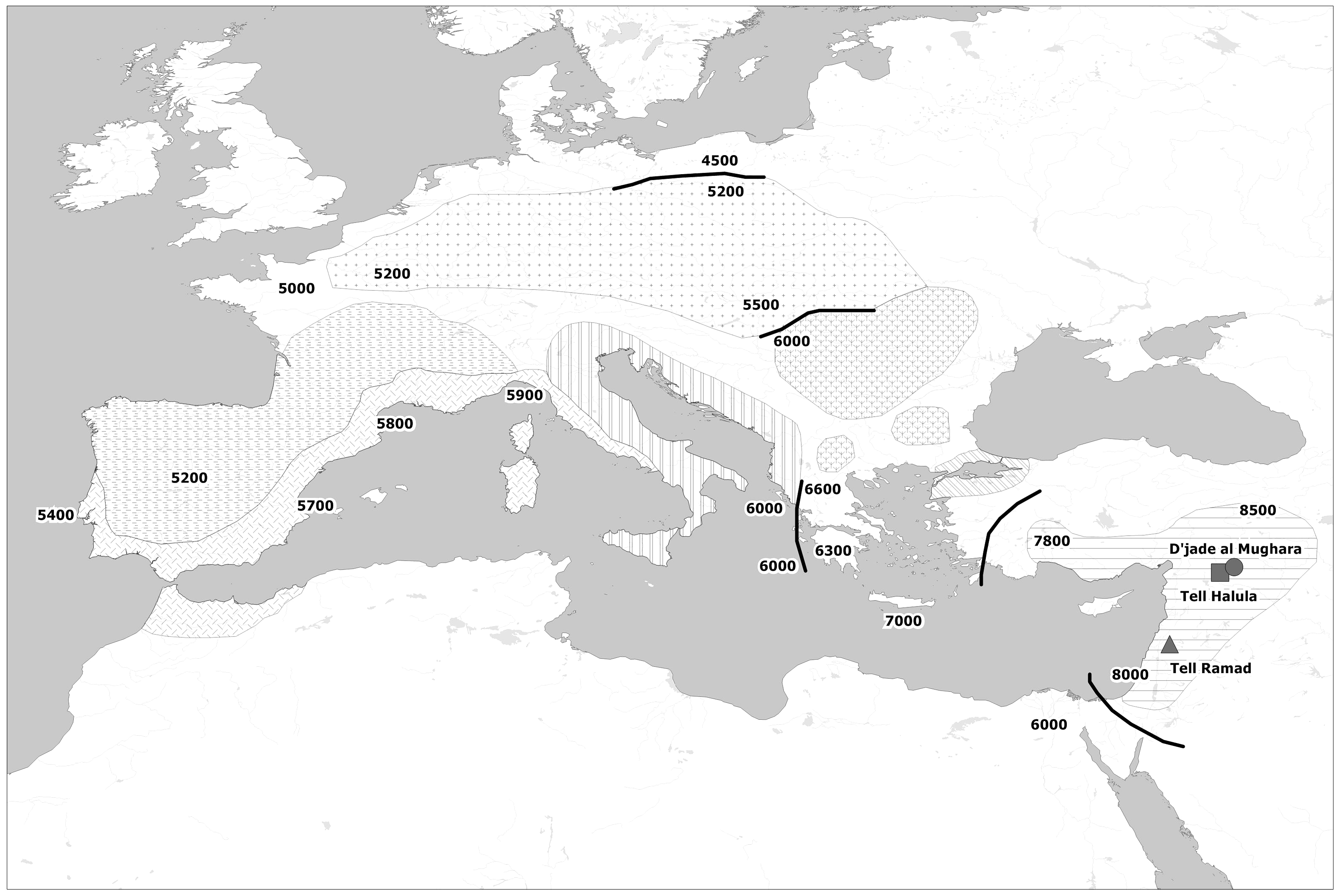
Map of the spread of Neolithic farming cultures from the Near-East to Europe and Egypt with dates. Egypt was reached circa 6000 BC

==== Neolithic migration hypotheses (circa 9000~6000 BC) ====
The timing of the admixture event cannot be calculated directly from the 2025 genetic study. The 2025 study showed that the Nuwayrat sample had the greatest affinity with samples from Neolithic Mesopotamia dating to 9000-8000 BC (composed of individuals from Nemrik 9, Boncuklu Tarla and Çayönü, from the Pre-Pottery Neolithic A and Pre-Pottery Neolithic B periods). Concurrently, other studies have shown that during the Neolithic, in the 10,000-5000 BC period, populations from Mesopotamia and the Zagros expanded into the Near-East, particularly Anatolia, bringing with them the Neolithic package of technological innovation (domesticated plants, pottery, greater sedentism). Egypt may also have been affected by such migratory movements. Further changes in odontometrics and dental tissues have been observed in the Nile Valley around 6000 BC. Subsequent cultural influxes from Mesopotamia are documented into the 4th millennium (3999-3000 BC) with the appearance of Late Uruk artistic features during the Late Pre-dynastic period of Egypt.

==== Chalcolithic (Copper Age) hypotheses (circa 5000-3300 BC) ====
Further Mesopotamian expansions into the Near-East are dated to the Chalcolithic (5000–3300 BC) and subsequent Bronze age periods, with high proportions of Mesopotamian ancestry found in human samples of this period in the Anatolian and Chalcolithic Levantine regions. However, the present 2025 study also showed through follow-up qpAdm analysis that these Chalcolithic Near-Eastern populations could not be a potential source of the Nuwayrat sample. This suggests that the proposed Copper Age arrival of the Mesopotamian ancestry in Egypt must have occurred through either an as-yet-unknown migration path across the Near-East, or by way of maritime trade-routes over the Mediterranean or Red Sea.

== Historical context ==
Overall, the 2025 study "provides direct evidence of genetic ancestry related to the eastern Fertile Crescent in ancient Egypt". This genetic connection suggests that there had been ancient migration flows from the eastern Fertile Crescent to Egypt, in addition to the exchanges of objects and imagery (domesticated animals and plants, writing systems...) already observed. This suggests a pattern of wide cultural and demographic expansion from the Mesopotamian region, which affected both Anatolia and Egypt during this period.

== Later genetic evolutions ==
=== Bronze Age Canaanite expansion (c.1800 BC) ===
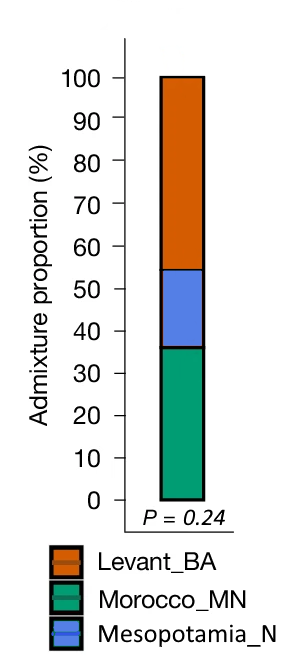
Ancestry proportions of the Third Intermediate Period genomes for the best-fit three-source model (qpAdm)

The 2025 study re-analysed previously published genetic data from Third Intermediate Period mummies (787-544 BC). It showed marginal continuity from the Nuwayrat sample, complemented by a significant Levantine ancestry influx, its main source being Bronze Age Levant ancestry, appearing at around 64% in the main model (P=0.32). The best-fit three-source model showed 46% for Levantine, 18% for Mesopotamian, and 36% for Moroccan-type ancestry (P=0.24). This shift towards majority Levantine ancestry could have originated in the proposed Bronze Age Canaanite expansion of the end of the Middle Kingdom and the advent of the Second Intermediate Period of Egypt, associated with the rise of the Hyksos and the Late Bronze Age collapse.

=== Modern Egypt ===
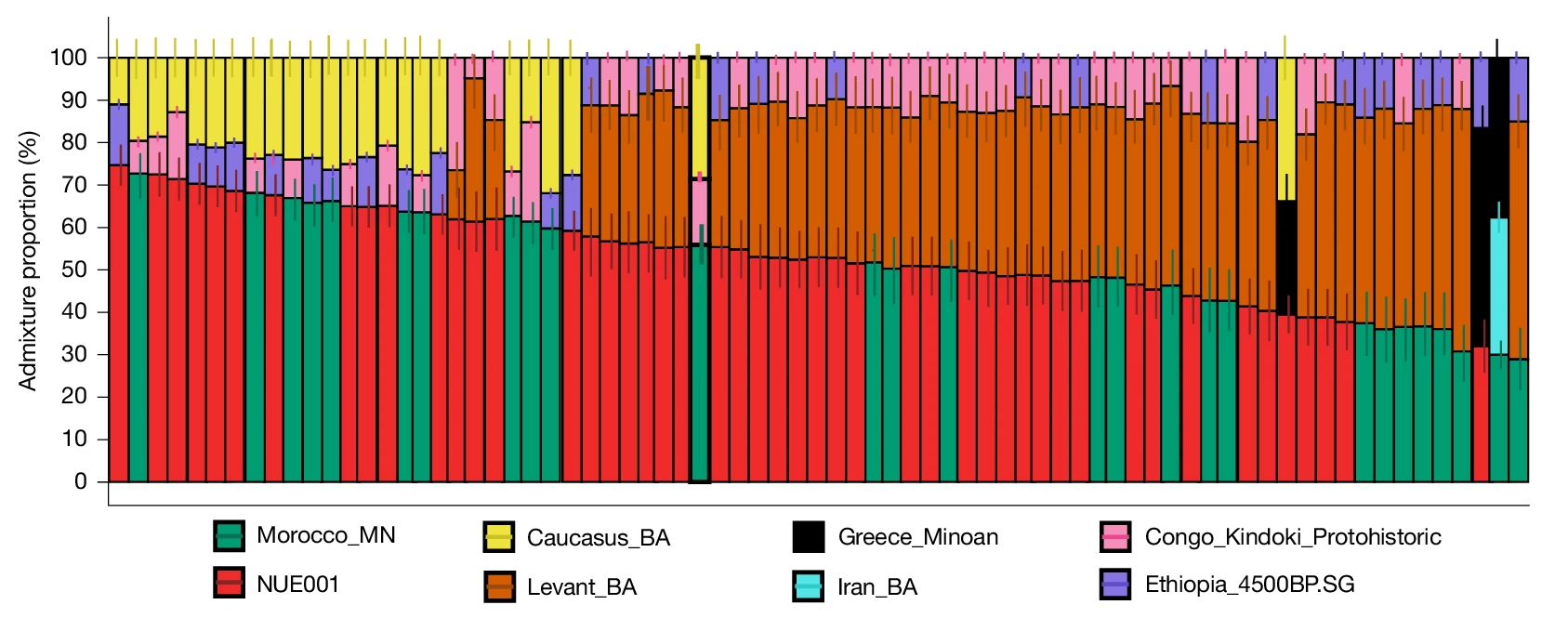
Ancestry proportions of a number of present-day Egyptian genomes for the best-fit model (qpAdm), with NUE001 ancestry ●

Genetic modelling suggests that most present-day Egyptians derive their ancestry from a combination of five ancient populations. Up to ~75% traces back to groups related to either the Old Kingdom individual from Nuwayrat or to Middle Neolithic populations from the Prehistoric North Africa, which itself contributed approximately 80% of the Nuwayrat individual's ancestry. Additional components include ancestry related to the Bronze Age Levant, which the researchers note as the second most prevalent ancestry component, as well as more recent admixture from sub-Saharan Africa (East and West African ancestries) that the authors noted was suggested from previous published analysis and their models.

== Significance ==
The study of NUE001 represents the first successfully sequenced genome from an Early Dynastic Egyptian and expands understanding of the demographic history of ancient Egypt by providing evidence for early human mobility and interaction across regions previously connected primarily through material culture..

== See also ==
- Ancient Egyptian race controversy
- DNA history of Egypt
- Dynastic race theory
- Population history of Egypt

== Sources ==
- Altınışık, N. Ezgi; Kazancı, Duygu Deniz; Aydoğan, Ayça; Gemici, Hasan Can; Erdal, Ömür Dilek; Sarıaltun, Savaş; Vural, Kıvılcım Başak; Koptekin, Dilek; Gürün, Kanat; Sağlıcan, Ekin; Fernandes, Daniel; Çakan, Gökhan; Koruyucu, Meliha Melis; Lagerholm, Vendela Kempe; Karamurat, Cansu; Özkan, Mustafa; Kılınç, Gülşah Merve; Sevkar, Arda; Sürer, Elif; Götherström, Anders; Atakuman, Çiğdem; Erdal, Yılmaz Selim; Özer, Füsun; Erim Özdoğan, Aslı; Somel, Mehmet (4 November 2022). "A genomic snapshot of demographic and cultural dynamism in Upper Mesopotamia during the Neolithic Transition". Science Advances. 8 (44) eabo3609. Bibcode:2022SciA....8O3609A. doi:10.1126/sciadv.abo3609. ISSN 2375-2548. PMC 9635823. PMID 36332018.
- Dietrich, Oliver (8 May 2016a). "The current distribution of sites with T-shaped pillars". Tepe Telegrams.
- Morez Jacobs, Adeline; Irish, Joel D.; Cooke, Ashley; Anastasiadou, Kyriaki; Barrington, Christopher; Gilardet, Alexandre; Kelly, Monica; Silva, Marina; Speidel, Leo; Tait, Frankie; Williams, Mia; Brucato, Nicolas; Ricaut, Francois-Xavier; Wilkinson, Caroline; Madgwick, Richard; Holt, Emily; Nederbragt, Alexandra J.; Inglis, Edward; Hajdinjak, Mateja; Skoglund, Pontus; Girdland-Flink, Linus (2 July 2025). "Whole-genome ancestry of an Old Kingdom Egyptian". Nature. 644 (8077): 714–721. Bibcode:2025Natur.644..714M. doi:10.1038/s41586-025-09195-5. ISSN 1476-4687. PMC 12367555. PMID 40604286.
- Simões, Luciana G.; Günther, Torsten; Martínez-Sánchez, Rafael M.; Vera-Rodríguez, Juan Carlos; Iriarte, Eneko; Rodríguez-Varela, Ricardo; Bokbot, Youssef; Valdiosera, Cristina; Jakobsson, Mattias (June 2023). "Northwest African Neolithic initiated by migrants from Iberia and Levant". Nature. 618 (7965): 550–556. Bibcode:2023Natur.618..550S. doi:10.1038/s41586-023-06166-6. ISSN 1476-4687. PMC 10266975. PMID 37286608.
