= Boncuklu Tarla =

Neolithic archaeological site in Turkey

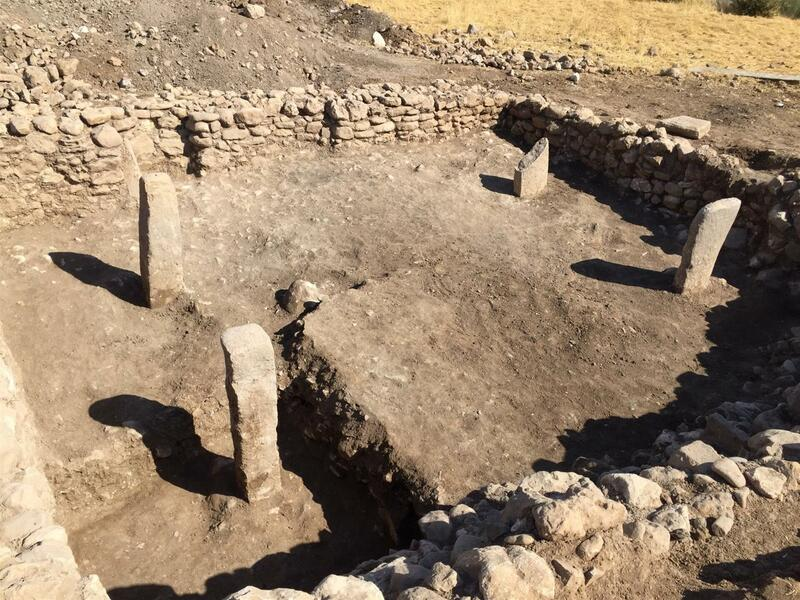
- Boncuklu Tarla in 2019

- Location in Turkey
- 37.529444°N 41.832361°E
- Type: Settlement
- Location: Ilisu, Mardin, Turkey

History
- Built: c. 9000 BC
- Abandoned: c. 8500 BC

Site notes
- Excavation dates: 2012–present
- Discovered: 2008

Boncuklu Tarla (meaning "beaded field", in Turkish) is an archaeological site in Mardin, Turkey. It is the remains of a settlement occupied from the Late Epipalaeolithic to Pre-Pottery Neolithic B periods, starting around 9000 BC. It was discovered in 2008 during an archaeological survey in advance of the construction of the Ilısu Dam and has been excavated by a team from Mardin Museum since 2012.

The discovery of a large communal building with stone pillars was reported at Boncuklu Tarla in 2019, prompting comparisons to the Taş Tepeler culture site of Göbekli Tepe. It is an early example of rectangular plan architecture. The excavators also claimed to have found a sewer system, which if confirmed would be the oldest known in the world.

== Discovery ==
Boncuklu Tarla was discovered in the district of Dargeçit in Mardin in 2008. The discovery was made during a prospecting dig near Ilisu dam. The site underwent its first excavation in 2012 under the auspices of the Mardin Museum which was followed by a second excavation by Dr. Ergül Kodaş of the University of Mardin Artuklu in 2017. The temple found at Boncuklu Tarla is from the same period as Göbekli Tepe. Ibrahim Ozcosar, a Turkish university rector, has made statements claiming Boncuklu Tarla is older than Göbekli Tepe.

== Excavation ==
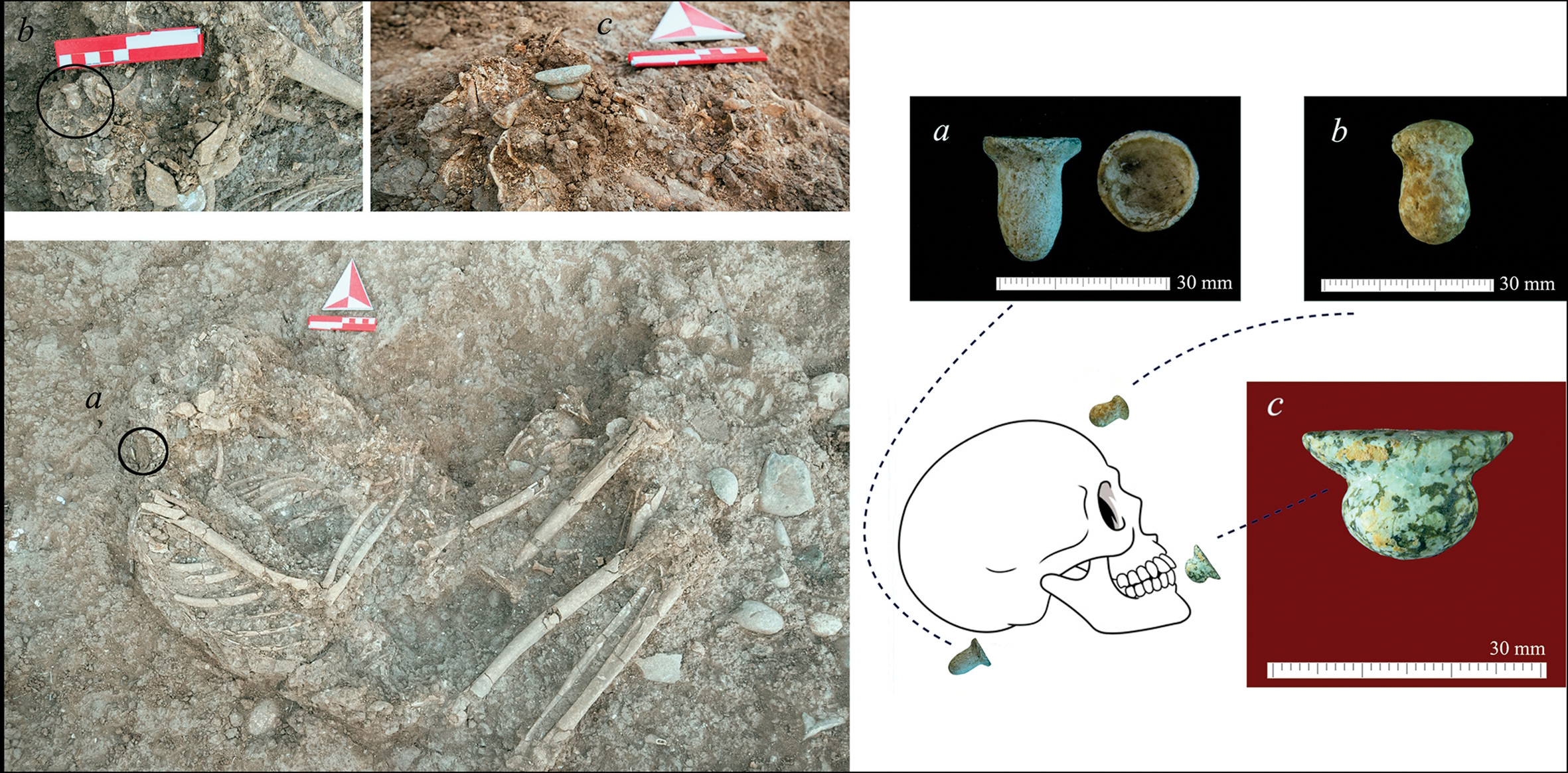
Neolithic ear and lip ornaments and in-situ skeleton, from Boncuklu Tarla

The 2012 excavation of Boncuklu Tarla had a scope of “studies for the Documentation and Rescue of Cultural Assets Remaining in the Interaction Area of the Ilısu Dam and HES Project” around the rural neighbourhood of Ilisu. More than 15 restorers and archaeologists have assisted in the excavation of the area with the aid of 50 workers. The excavations were carried over into 2017 by initiating an excavation in the eastern sector of Boncuklu Tarla. In 2019, this excavation revealed that this section of the site was occupied over three different phases during the 10th millennium BC. The excavation uncovered four types of building structures, a sewage system, and over two dozen artifacts. Among the artifacts found at Boncuklu Tarla were thousands of beads for ornaments, obsidian or flint blades, and tools used to cut stone. Tools discovered also included blades, gimlets, arrowheads, and microliths.

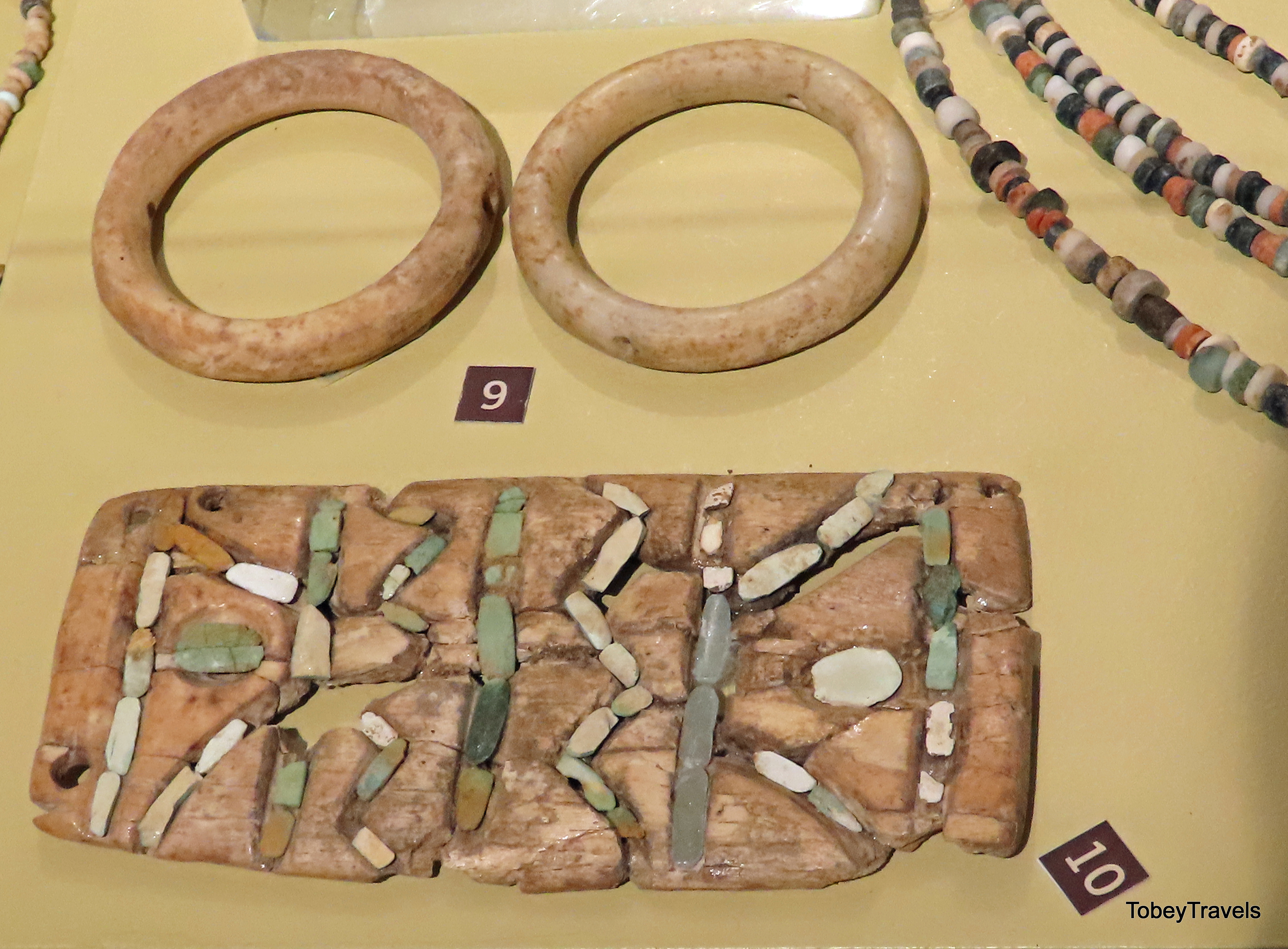
Grave Goods, Stone Plaque and Belt Buckles, Boncuklu Tarla, Ilisu Dam, Mardin Museum, Turkey

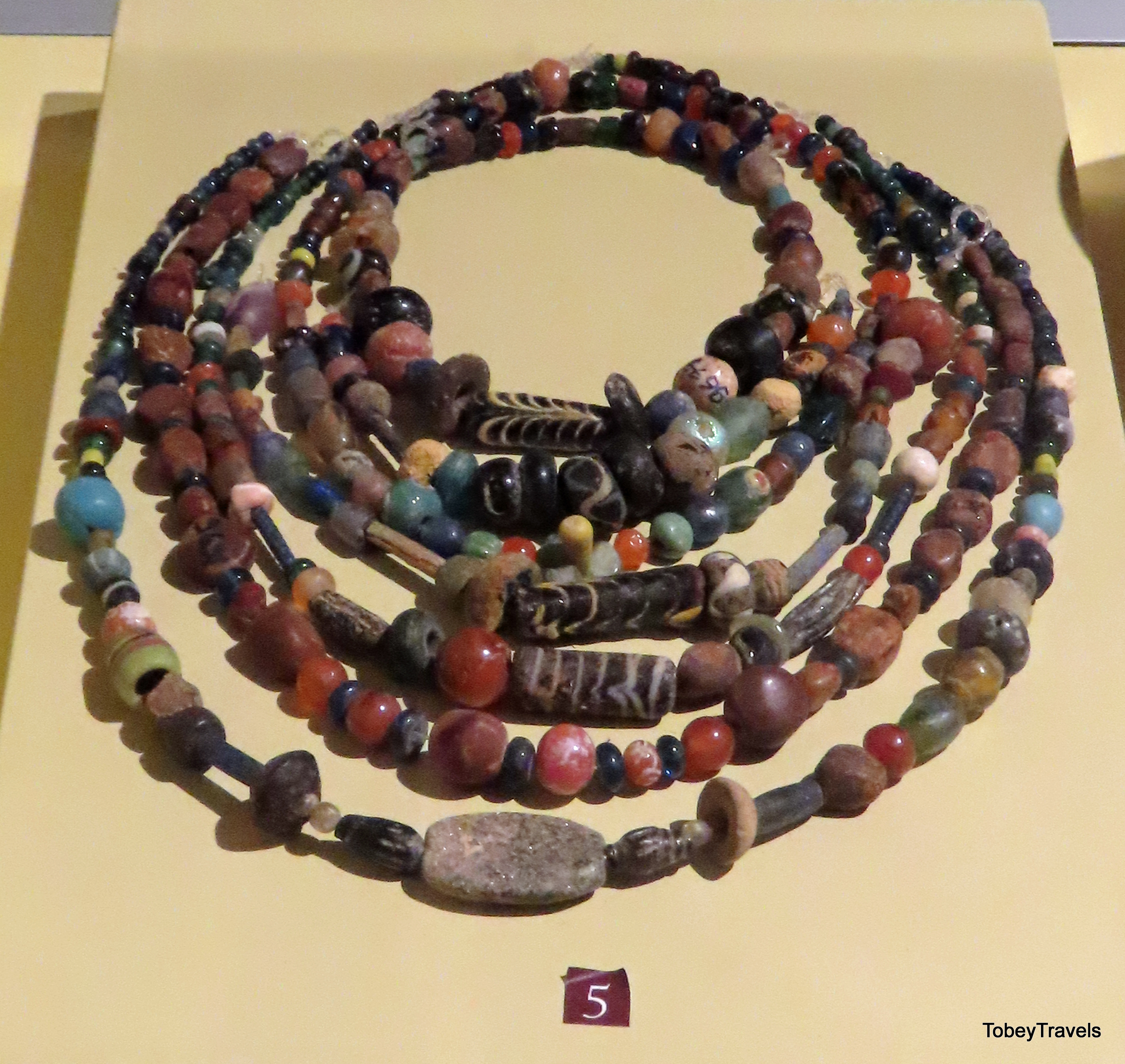
Grave Goods, Stone Necklace, Boncuklu Tarla, Ilisu Dam, Mardin Museum, Turkey

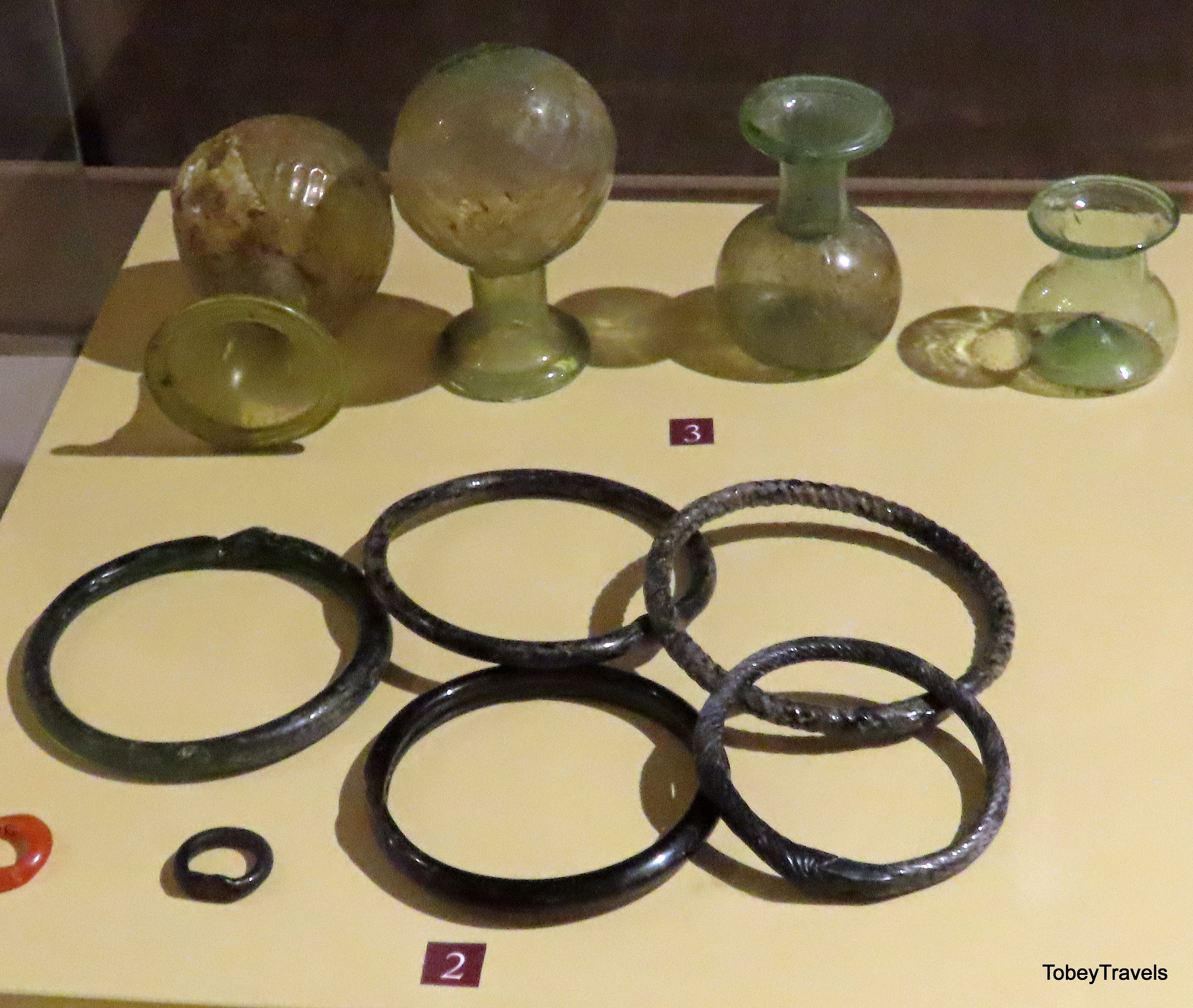
Grave Goods, Bracelets and Glass Bottles, Boncuklu Tarla, Ilisu Dam, Mardin Museum, Turkey

== Geography and environment ==
Boncuklu Tarla is located in Mardin Province in Eastern Turkey. The site sits around 125 km east of the city of Mardin within the district of Dargecit. Boncuklu Tarla is within 1.5 km of the Tigris River. Due to the site’s proximity to the river, it is highly likely Boncuklu Tarla underwent many phases of flooding as with many other riverine communities. This supports the theory that there were phases in the construction of the site, which was recognised by the site’s archaeologists. Some parts of Boncuklu Tarla were constructed on the bedrock of the location.

== Chronology ==
This area is known to have had many established civilisations such as the Sumerian, Akkadians, Babylonians, Hittites, Urartians, Armenians, Kurds, Romans, Abbasids, Seljuks, and Ottomans. Analysis was done onsite as well as C14 calibration and laboratory studies to determine that at least six levels of occupation occurred at Boncuklu Tarla. These six levels, extending backwards in time, include the Late Pre-Pottery Neolithic B, middle Pre-Pottery Neolithic B, old Pre-Pottery Neolithic B, the transition from Pre-Pottery Neolithic B to Pre-Pottery Neolithic A, and the later Epipaleolithic.

== Architecture ==
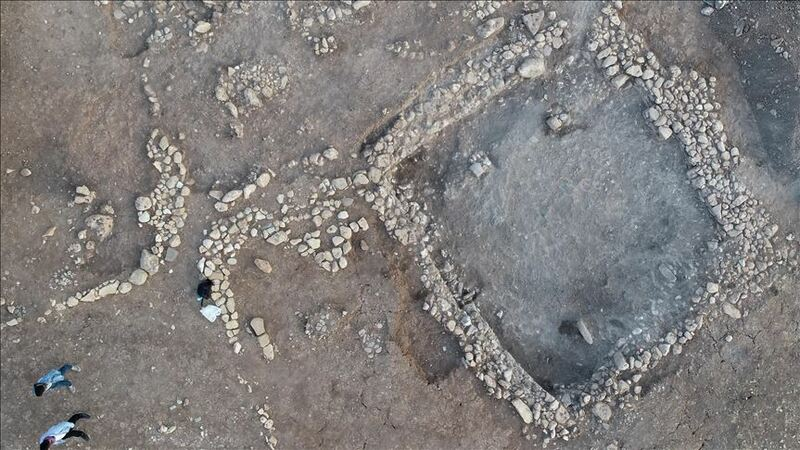
Boncuklu Tarla, Dargecit Neolithic temple (top view)

Boncuklu Tarla displays four different forms of communal space usage within the village. These usages range from communal building to domestic housing, storage spaces, and unconstructed or open communal spaces. The communal building, sometimes referred to as the temple, is located in the centre amongst houses varying in shape and size. These homes are either circular or partially rectangular in shape while the communal building is the only structure that is rectangular. This construction originates from the tenth millennium BC during which time the rectangular buildings were first revealed. The rectangular plan was slow to be adopted systematically during this time. Therefore the adoption of this designed shape of buildings up to eight stories high, reaching a height of seven meters, might have begun with the construction of the communal building of Boncuklu Tarla. The head of the excavation team has speculated that buildings up to eight stories high and reaching a height of seven metres could have been possible.

The communal building of Boncuklu Tarla has five structurally insignificant buttresses on the eastern and western walls. The eastern wall has two well-preserved buttresses while the western has three that are damaged. The western and eastern buttresses do not perfectly align nor are they positioned in line with the four pillars located in the centre of the building. The existence of this type of buttress has been well characterised at other sites such as Karahan Tepe, Göbekli Tepe, and Çayönü, but Boncuklu Tarla’s differ in that they do not align with the communal building's symmetrical pillars. Unlike Çayönü, the purpose of the buttresses at Boncuklu Tarla was not structural but in fact only provided spatial differentiation to the interior. All the buttresses have measurements of approximately 50 cm in length and 30 cm in depth. The north wall on the north-eastern corner also contains a niche measuring at 40 x 40 cm.

Surrounding the Communal building at Boncuklu Tarla three other sub rectangular building were uncovered. They were named Strata II, III, and VII and all measured between 8–10 metres in length and 4–5 metres in width. Stratum III has entirely independent walls while Strata II and VII both share common walls with the communal building to the west and east, respectively. The excavation has uncovered that the three structures also have buttresses at the front of their entrances, near the angle of the wall course. Beaten and smoothed over earth makes up the floor of the three buildings.

Two circular buildings have been found at Boncuklu Tarla. These structures also share the beaten floor and buttress features that the sub rectangular buildings have; however, some parts also contain pebbled flooring. Both the circular structures have extensions off their entrances, one rectangular and the other circular. The building located to the North is named Stratum IV and the one to the west Stratum VI.

== Genetics ==
Bronze Age samples and locations and dates of Mesopotamia_Neolithic ancestry: Nemrik 9 (9500-8000 BC), Boncuklu (9000-8500 BC), Çayönü (8300-7500 BC)

Human samples from Boncuklu Tarla dated to around 9000-8500 BC were part of a recent genetic study, as members of a Mesopotamia Neolithic cluster (together with Çayönü and Nemrik 9 samples). In this study, the Mesopotamia Neolithic cluster appeared as a major ancestry of several Levantine and Egyptian Bronze Age individuals, particularly from Ebla, Ashkalon, Baq'ah and Nuwayrat.

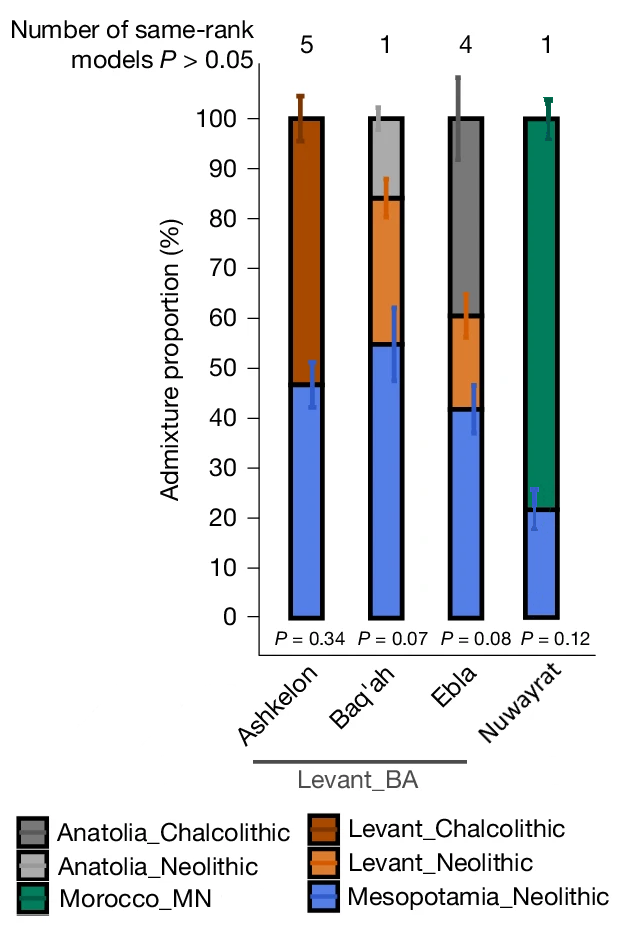
Ancestry proportions of Ascalon, Ebla, Baq'ah and Nuwayrat Bronze Age samples for the best-fit full model (qpAdm)

The Nuwayrat individual in particular, an Old Kingdom adult male Egyptian of relatively high-status radiocarbon-dated to 2855–2570 BC and dubbed "Old Kingdom Individual (NUE001)", was found to be associated with North African Neolithic ancestry, but about 24% of his genetic ancestry could be sourced to the eastern Fertile Crescent, including Mesopotamia, corresponding to the Mesopotamia Neolithic cluster. The genetic profile was most closely represented by a two-source model, in which 77.6% ± 3.8% of the ancestry corresponded to genomes from the Middle Neolithic Moroccan site of Skhirat-Rouazi (dated to 4780–4230 BC), which itself consists of predominantly (76.4 ± 4.0%) Levant Neolithic ancestry and (23.6 ± 4.0%) minor Iberomaurusian ancestry, while the remainder (22.4% ± 3.8%) was most closely related to known genomes from Neolithic Mesopotamia (dated to 9000-8000 BC). No other two-source model met the significance criteria (P>0.05). A total of two Three-source models also emerged, but had similar ancestry proportions, with the addition of a much smaller third-place component from the Neolithic/Chalcolithic Levant. According to Lazardis, “What this sample does tell us is that at such an early date there were people in Egypt that were mostly North African in ancestry, but with some contribution of ancestry from Mesopotamia". According to Girdland-Flink, the fact that 20% of the man’s ancestry best matches older genomes from Mesopotamia, suggests that the movement of Mesopotamian people into Egypt may have been fairly substantial at some point.

The timing of the admixture event cannot be calculated directly from the 2025 genetic study. The 2025 study showed that the Nuwayrat sample had the greatest affinity with samples from Neolithic Mesopotamia dating to 9000-8000 BC Concurrently, other studies have shown that during the Neolithic, in the 10,000-5000 BC period, populations from Mesopotamia and the Zagros expanded into the Near-East, particularly Anatolia, bringing with them the Neolithic package of technological innovation (domesticated plants, pottery, greater sedentism). Egypt may also have been affected by such migratory movements. Further changes in odontometrics and dental tissues have been observed in the Nile Valley around 6000 BCE. Subsequent cultural influxes from Mesopotamia are documented into the 4th millennium (3999-3000 BC) with the appearance of Late Uruk features during the Late Pre-dynastic period of Egypt.

== Sources ==
- Morez Jacobs, Adeline; Irish, Joel D.; Cooke, Ashley; Anastasiadou, Kyriaki; Barrington, Christopher; Gilardet, Alexandre; Kelly, Monica; Silva, Marina; Speidel, Leo; Tait, Frankie; Williams, Mia; Brucato, Nicolas; Ricaut, Francois-Xavier; Wilkinson, Caroline; Madgwick, Richard; Holt, Emily; Nederbragt, Alexandra J.; Inglis, Edward; Hajdinjak, Mateja; Skoglund, Pontus; Girdland-Flink, Linus (2 July 2025). "Whole-genome ancestry of an Old Kingdom Egyptian". Nature: 1–8. doi:10.1038/s41586-025-09195-5. ISSN 1476-4687. PMC 12367555. PMID 40604286.
