= Chhayanat =

Chhayanat may refer to:

- Chhayanaut, a cultural organisation of Bangladesh
- Chhayanat (raga), the Hindustani raga

== See also ==
- Chhaya (disambiguation)
- Chhayanath Rara, an urban municipality in Nepal
