= Çayönü =

Neolithic settlement in Turkey

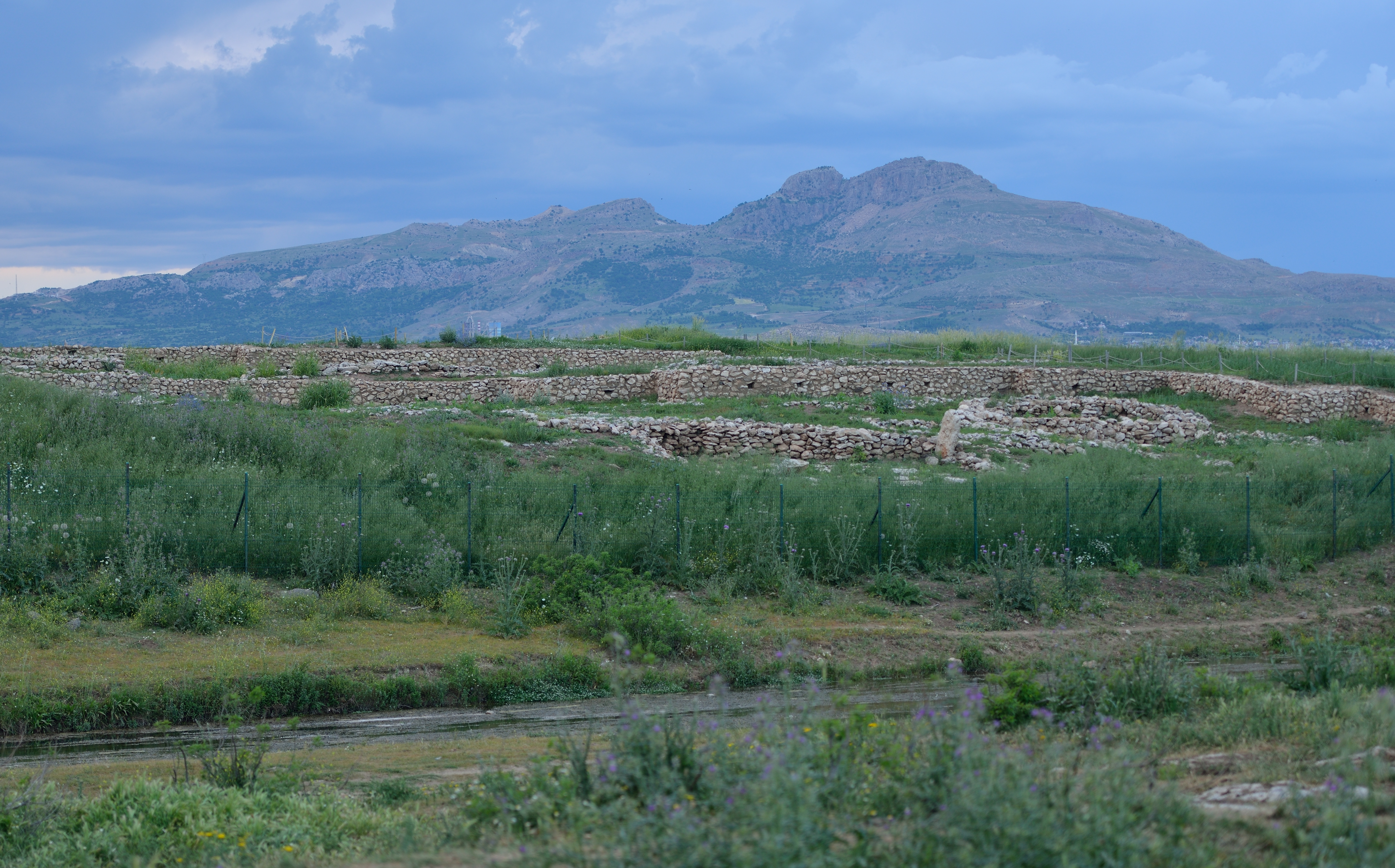
- Cayonu in 2017

- Location in Turkey
- 38°12′59″N 39°43′35″E
- Type: Settlement
- Location: Diyarbakir, Turkey

History
- Built: c. 8630 BC
- Abandoned: c. 6800 BC

Site notes
- Excavation dates: 1964-1991

Çayönü Tepesi is a Pre-Pottery Neolithic B settlement in southeastern Turkey which prospered from around 8630 to 6800 BC. It is located in Diyarbakır 40 kilometres northwest of Diyarbakır, 140 kilometers northeast of Şanlıurfa, at the foot of the Taurus Mountains. It lies near the Boğazçay, a tributary of the upper Tigris River and the Bestakot, an intermittent stream. It is an early example of agriculture.

Çayönü Tepesi belongs to the "Taş Tepeler" monumental tradition of Göbekli Tepe, a style found in all the Pre-Pottery Neolithic sites of the Urfa region. There are some variations though, such as using decorated stelae, but without the characteristic T-shape of Göbekli Tepe.

== Settlement ==
At first, Cayonu represented single room structures that were round or had rounded corners. On top were built wattle and daub constructions. The next phase consisted of grill-plan buildings. This refers to a type of the building foundation.

"The grills were composed of a series of parallel linear stone foundations, carefully built of small stones and no more than 15 cm high (Schirmer 1990), which supported an elevated plastered floor, keeping it insulated, ventilated and dry."

== Archaeology ==
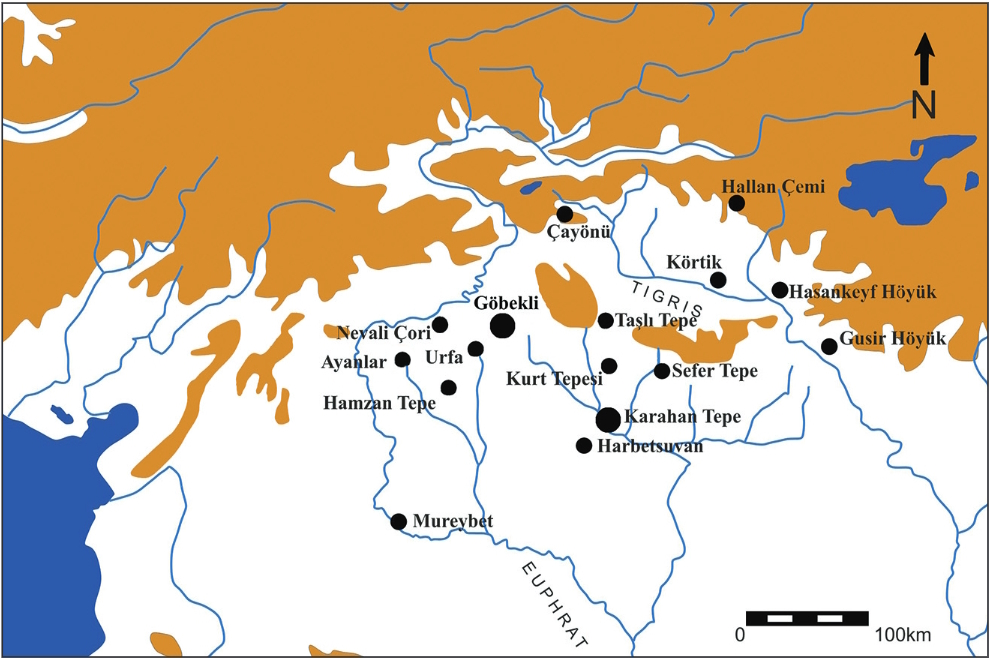
Main Upper Mesopotamian Pre-Pottery Neolithic centers, with Çayönü

The site was excavated for 16 seasons between 1964 and 1991, initially by Robert Braidwood and Halet Çambel and later by Mehmet Özdoğan and Aslı Erim Özdoğan. The settlement covers the periods of the Pre-Pottery Neolithic A (PPNA), the Pre-Pottery Neolithic B (PPNB), and the Pottery Neolithic (PN).

The stratigraphy is divided into the following subphases according to the dominant architecture:

- round, PPNA
- grill, PPNA (grill-plan buildings)
- channeled, Early PPNB
- cobble paved, Middle PPNB
- cell, Late PPNB
- large room, final PPNB

An analysis of blood found at the site suggested that human sacrifice occurred there.

Two stelae similar to the T-shapes stelae of Gobekli Tepe and Karahan Tepe were discovered in the "terrazzo floor" (layer II) at Çayönü Tepe. They are thought to have been symbolic images of men of gods. One of the two stelae had a human face in flat relief carved on it. These findings suggest stela worship, a form of cult which was prevalent in the Pre-Pottery Neolithic B period, and remained widespread in the Near-East until the 1st millennium BC.

In 2026, archaeologists excavating Çayönü, uncovered a specialised copper and malachite production workshop dating to approximately 6900–6800 BCE. The roughly 5 m² structure contained raw, partially processed, and worked malachite, together with copper beads and other copper objects, as well as a stone-paved working surface surrounded by postholes that may have supported a roof or canopy. The concentration of materials representing different stages of processing indicates that copper-related production was carried out at the site rather than the area serving only as a discard location. The discovery provides evidence for specialised craft production and the organisation of early metalworking communities during the Neolithic period.

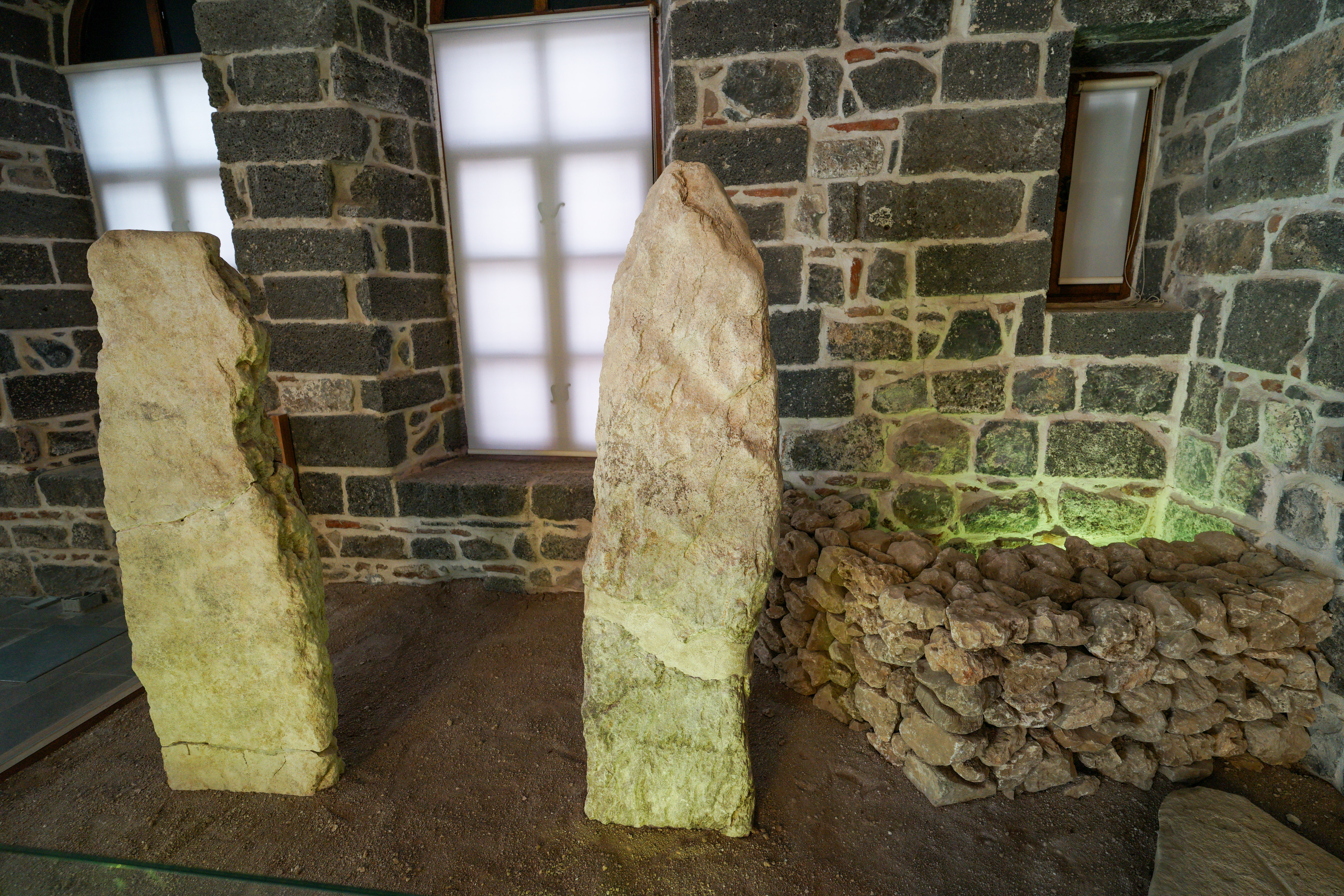
Çayönü standing stones, around 7500 BC, Diyarbakır Archaeology Museum

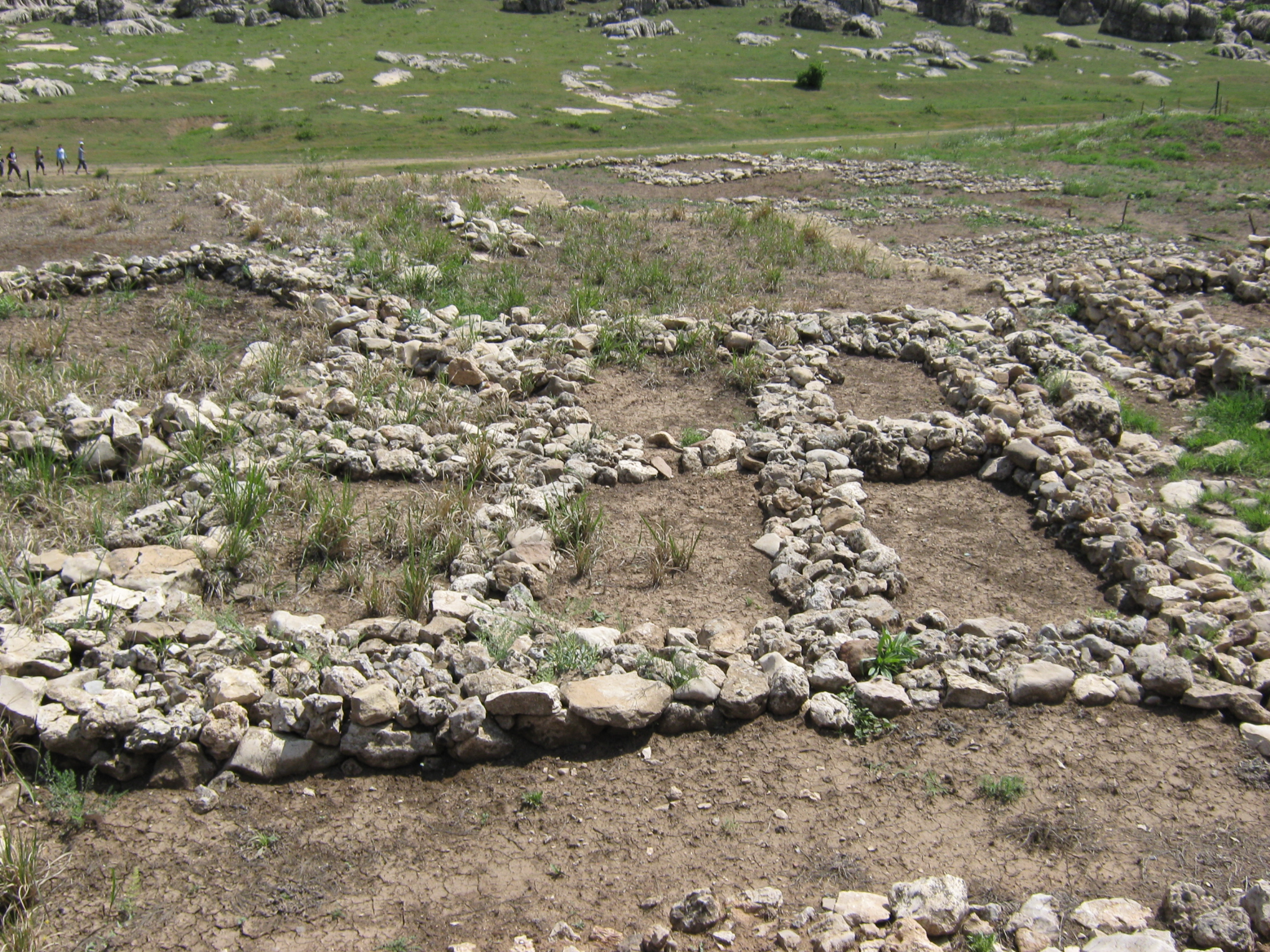
Cayönü ruins

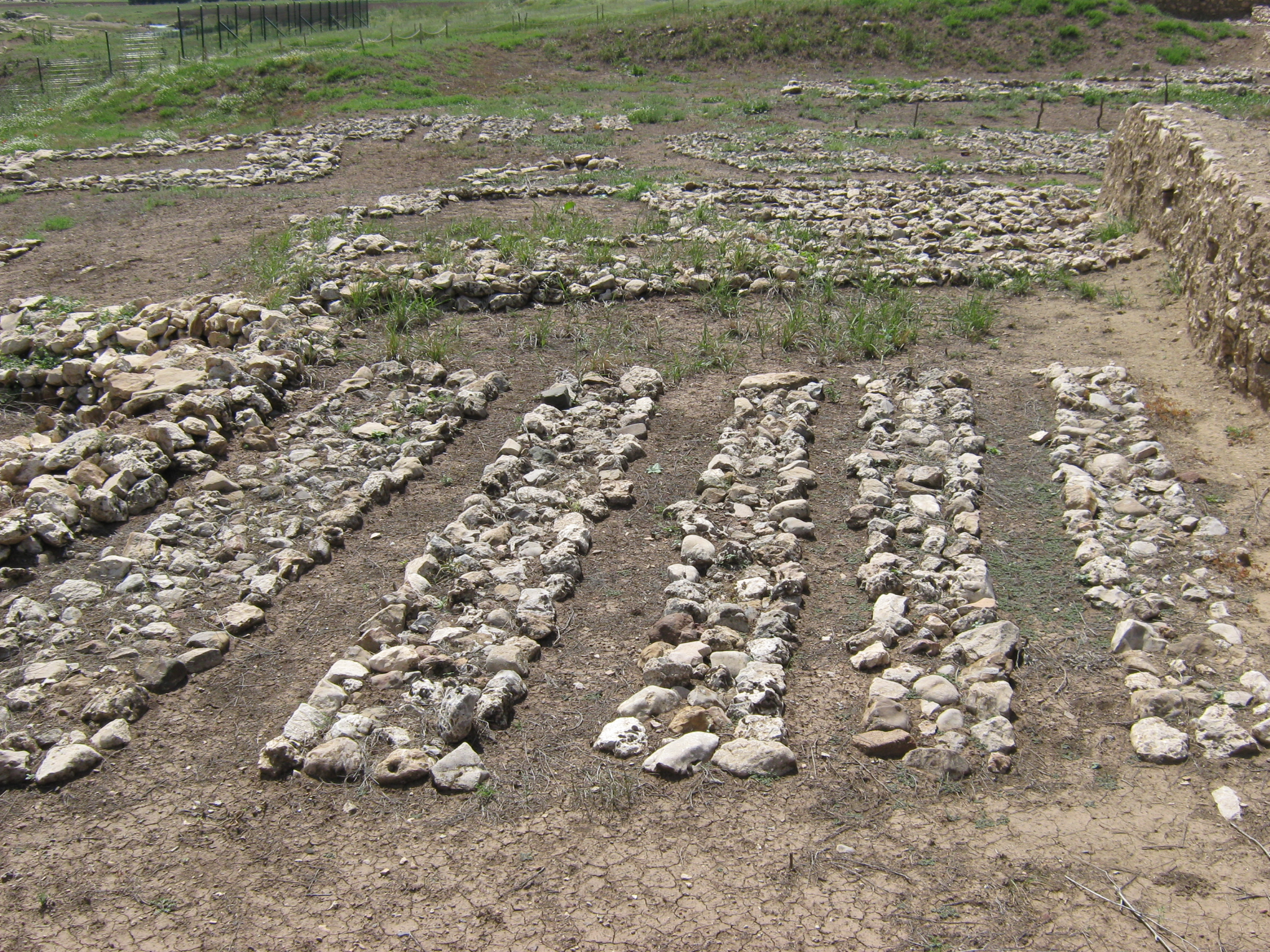
Grill architecture

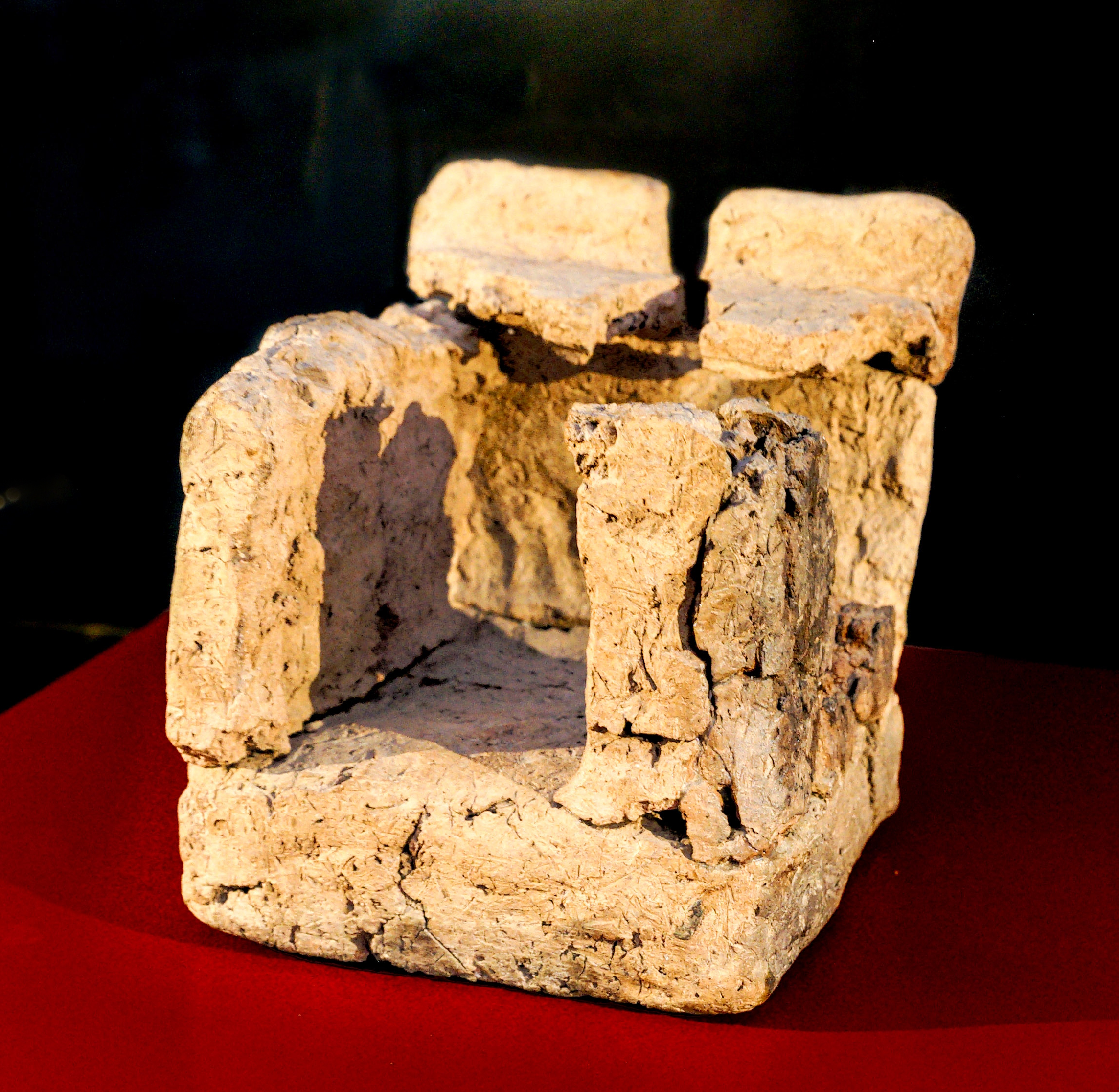
Pottery model of a house, 6600-6300 BC, Çayönü, Diyarbakır Archaeology Museum

== Origin of domestication ==
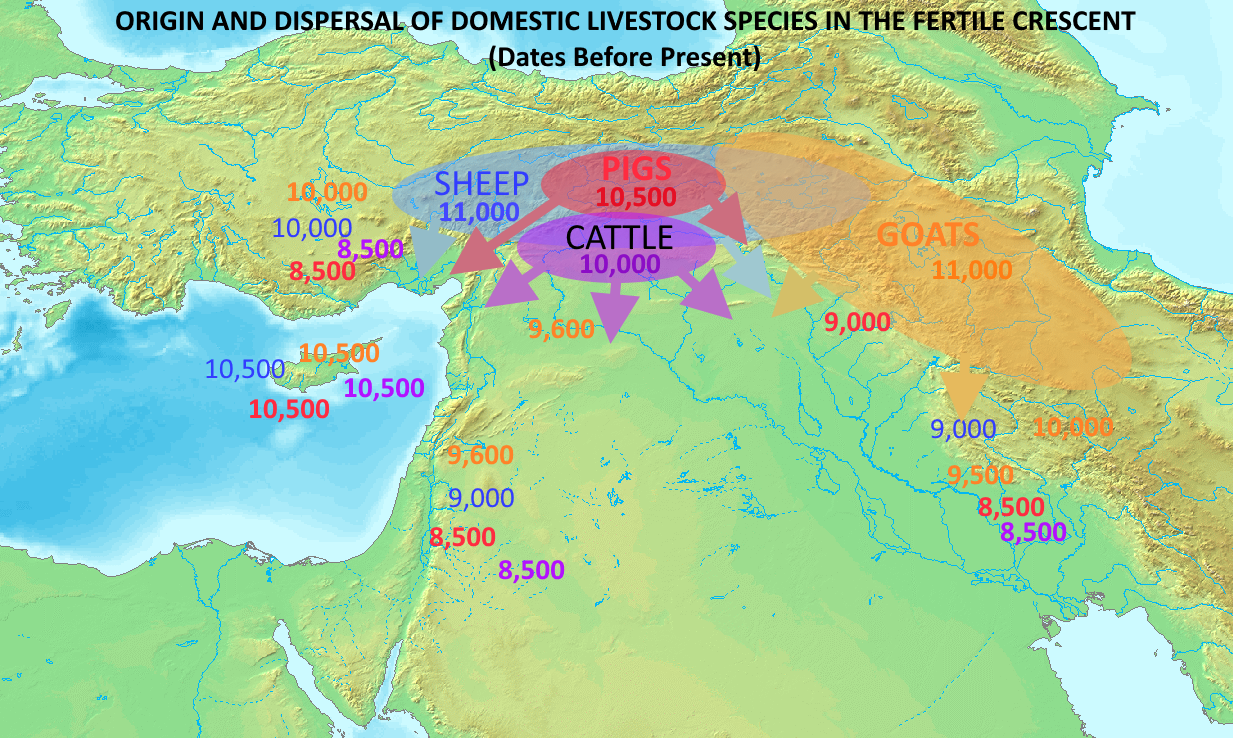
Origin and dispersal of domestic livestock species in the Fertile Crescent (dates Before Present)

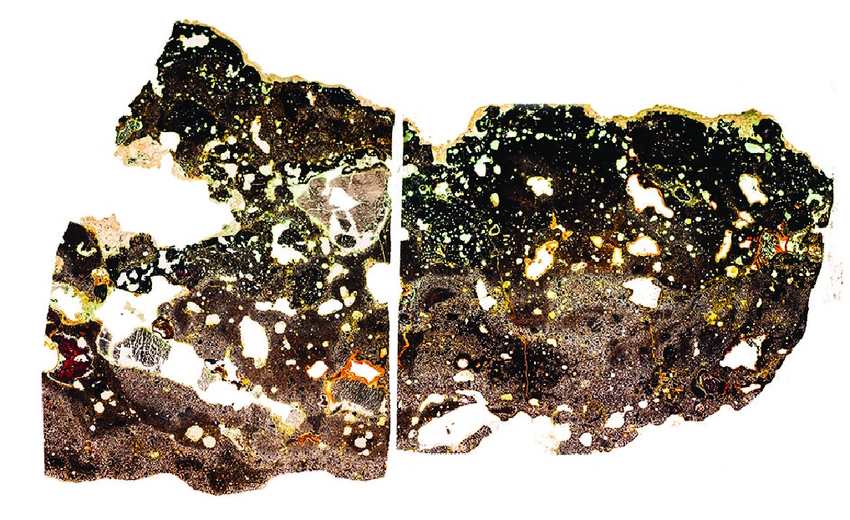
A section of a part of a slag cake. Çayönü Tepesi, Early Bronze Age I.

Çayönü Tepe developed from the cultural tradition of Gobekli Tepe, and started to implement agriculture from the 9th millennium BC, as other sites such as Neva Çori or Cafer Höyük.

=== Animal life – domestication of pigs and cattle ===
The settlement attests to the period of transition from hunting and gathering to plant and animal domestication. Domestic animals appear in the final aspects of Phase I (preceramic); prior to that, the bones of wild game are relatively abundant. Mainly sheep was domesticated at first.

In regard to cattle domestication, recently (2021) scholars make a distinction between "cattle management" and "domestic cattle". Çayönü Tepesi provides a time sequence clarifying changes in the human management of Bos populations from the earliest times.

Arbuckle and Kassebaum outline several stages of cattle management at Cayonu, and they present a rather complicated picture. Bos remains are abundant already in the earliest levels representing around 20% of the mammalian remains. Much later, around 7500 BC, cattle reach their maximum abundance at the site, but they are still phenotypically unchanged. Decrease in cattle size is evident only around 7000 BC, and continues thereafter at this and related sites in the area.

Çayönü is possibly the place where the pig (Sus scrofa) was first domesticated.

=== Farming – cultivation of cereals ===
Genetic studies of emmer wheat, the precursor of most current wheat species, show that the slopes of Mount Karaca (Karaca Dağ), which is located in close vicinity to Çayönü, was the location of first domestication. A different DNA approach pointed to Kartal Daği.

Robert Braidwood wrote that "insofar as unit HA can be considered as representing all of the major pre-historic occupation at Cayonu, cultivated emmer along with cultivated einkorn was present from the earliest sub-phase."

== Genetics ==
=== Origins ===
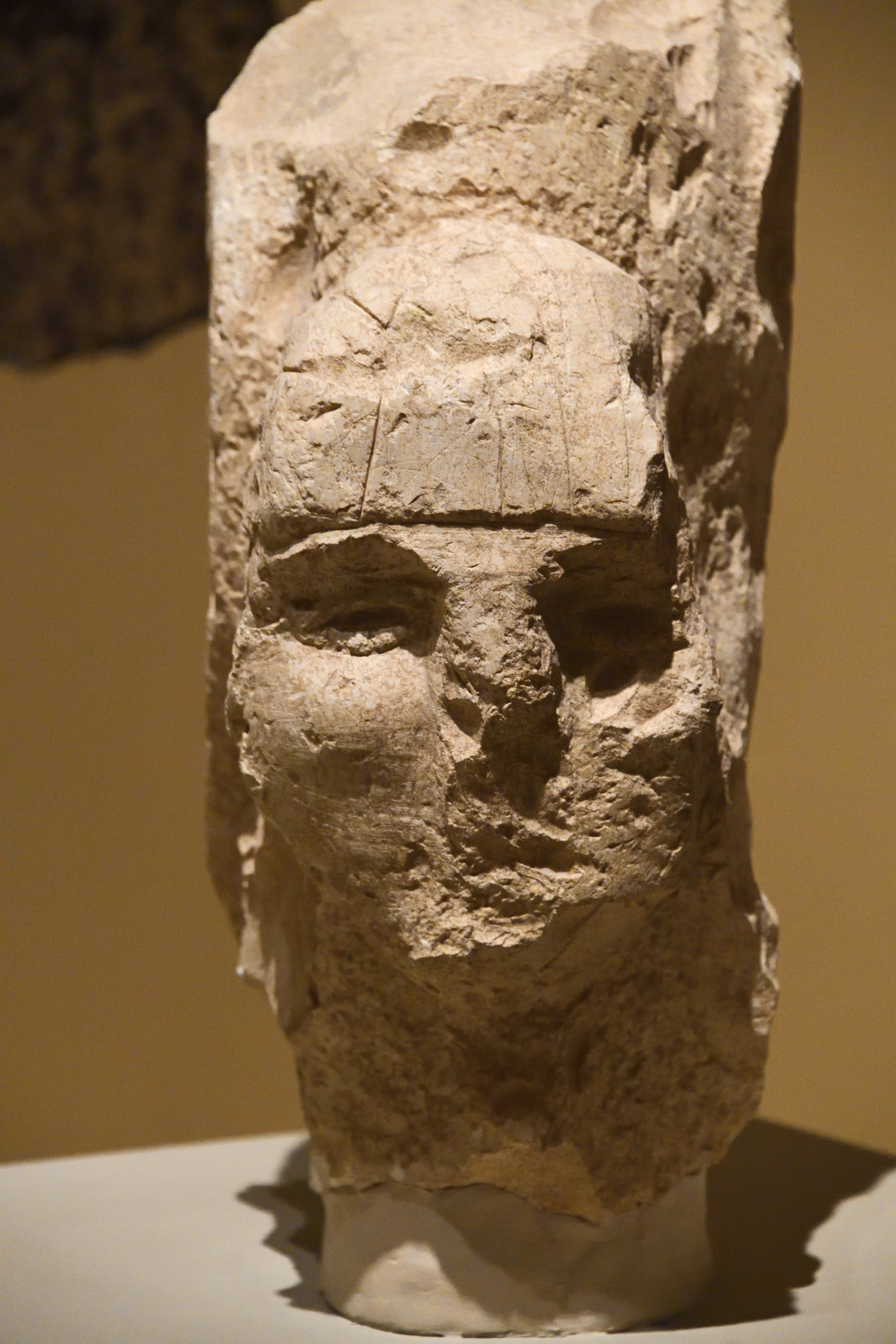
Contemporary sculpted head from nearby Nevalı Çori, 8400-8100 BC (Urfa Museum)

In a 2022 genetic study, the population of Çayönü (8300-7500 BC) was analyzed as a representative of the earliest known hunter-gatherer sedentary populations who built the monumental structure of Gobekli Tepe and domesticated various plants and animals, such as the einkorn, emmer, sheep, goats, pigs and cattles in Upper Mesopotamian. The Çayönü population was shown to be genetically diverse, carrying both western and eastern Fertile Crescent ancestry, and best modelled by an ancestry combining about 48% Anatolian Epipaleolithic, 33% Central Zagros Neolithic and 19% South Levant Neolithic components.

=== Diffusion ===
Bronze Age samples and locations and dates of Mesopotamia_Neolithic ancestry: Nemrik 9 (9500-8000 BC), Boncuklu (9000-8500 BC), Çayönü (8300-7500 BC)

Human samples from Çayönü dated to around 8300-7500 BC were also part of a recent 2025 genetic study, as members of a Mesopotamia Neolithic cluster (together with Boncuklu Tarla and Nemrik 9 samples). In this study, the Mesopotamia Neolithic cluster appeared as a major ancestry of several Levantine and Egyptian Bronze Age individuals, particularly from Ebla, Ashkalon, Baq'ah, and Nuwayrat.

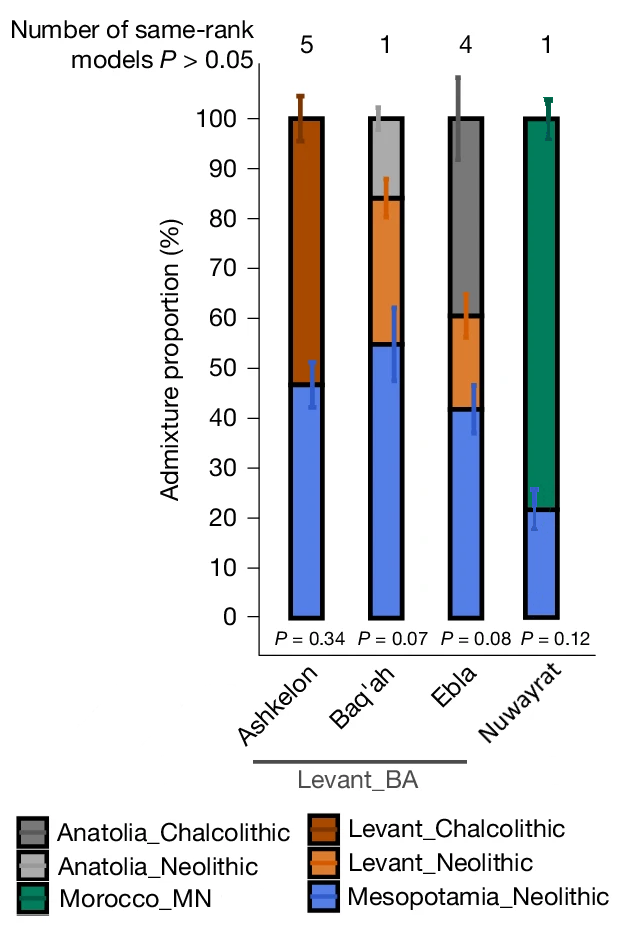
Ancestry proportions of Ascalon, Ebla, Baq'ah and Nuwayrat Bronze Age samples for the best-fit full model (qpAdm)

The Nuwayrat individual in particular, an Old Kingdom adult male Egyptian of relatively high-status radiocarbon-dated to 2855–2570 BC and dubbed "Old Kingdom individual (NUE001)", was found to be associated with North African Neolithic ancestry, but about 24% of his genetic ancestry could be sourced to the eastern Fertile Crescent, including Mesopotamia, corresponding to the Mesopotamia_Neolithic cluster. The genetic profile was most closely represented by a two-source model, in which 77.6% ± 3.8% of the ancestry corresponded to genomes from the Middle Neolithic Moroccan site of Skhirat-Rouazi (dated to 4780–4230 BC), which itself consists of predominantly (76.4 ± 4.0%) Levant Neolithic ancestry and (23.6 ± 4%) minor Iberomaurusian ancestry, while the remainder (22.4% ± 3.8%) was most closely related to known genomes from Neolithic Mesopotamia (dated to 9000-8000 BC). No other two-source model met the significance criteria (P>0.05). A total of two Three-source models also emerged, but had similar ancestry proportions, with the addition of a much smaller third-place component from the Neolithic/Chalcolithic Levant. According to Lazardis, "What this sample does tell us is that at such an early date there were people in Egypt that were mostly North African in ancestry, but with some contribution of ancestry from Mesopotamia". According to Girdland-Flink, the fact that 20% of the man's ancestry best matches older genomes from Mesopotamia, suggests that the movement of Mesopotamian people into Egypt may have been fairly substantial at some point.

The timing of the admixture event cannot be calculated directly from the 2025 genetic study. The 2025 study showed that the Nuwayrat sample had the greatest affinity with samples from Neolithic Mesopotamia dating to 9000-8000 BCE. Concurrently, other studies have shown that during the Neolithic, in the 10,000-5,000 BC period, populations from Mesopotamia and the Zagros expanded into the Near-East, particularly Anatolia, bringing with them the Neolithic package of technological innovation (domesticated plants, pottery, greater sedentism). Egypt may also have been affected by such migratory movements. Further changes in odontometrics and dental tissues have been observed in the Nile Valley around 6000 BC. Subsequent cultural influxes from Mesopotamia are documented into the 4th millennium (3999-3000 BC) with the appearance of Late Uruk features during the Late Pre-dynastic period of Egypt.

== See also ==
- Cities of the ancient Near East
- Göbekli Tepe
- Dja'de el-Mughara

== Sources ==
- Altınışık, N. Ezgi; Kazancı, Duygu Deniz; Aydoğan, Ayça; Gemici, Hasan Can; Erdal, Ömür Dilek; Sarıaltun, Savaş; Vural, Kıvılcım Başak; Koptekin, Dilek; Gürün, Kanat; Sağlıcan, Ekin; Fernandes, Daniel; Çakan, Gökhan; Koruyucu, Meliha Melis; Lagerholm, Vendela Kempe; Karamurat, Cansu; Özkan, Mustafa; Kılınç, Gülşah Merve; Sevkar, Arda; Sürer, Elif; Götherström, Anders; Atakuman, Çiğdem; Erdal, Yılmaz Selim; Özer, Füsun; Erim Özdoğan, Aslı; Somel, Mehmet (4 November 2022). "A genomic snapshot of demographic and cultural dynamism in Upper Mesopotamia during the Neolithic Transition". Science Advances. 8 (44) eabo3609. Bibcode:2022SciA....8O3609A. doi:10.1126/sciadv.abo3609. ISSN 2375-2548. PMC 9635823. PMID 36332018.
- Dietrich, Oliver (8 May 2016a). "The current distribution of sites with T-shaped pillars". Tepe Telegrams.
- Güler, Mustafa; Çelik, Bahattin; Güler, Gül (2012). "New pre-pottery neolithic settlements from Viranşehir District". Anadolu / Anatolia. 38: 164–80. doi:10.1501/Andl_0000000398.
- Morez Jacobs, Adeline; Irish, Joel D.; Cooke, Ashley; Anastasiadou, Kyriaki; Barrington, Christopher; Gilardet, Alexandre; Kelly, Monica; Silva, Marina; Speidel, Leo; Tait, Frankie; Williams, Mia; Brucato, Nicolas; Ricaut, Francois-Xavier; Wilkinson, Caroline; Madgwick, Richard; Holt, Emily; Nederbragt, Alexandra J.; Inglis, Edward; Hajdinjak, Mateja; Skoglund, Pontus; Girdland-Flink, Linus (2 July 2025). "Whole-genome ancestry of an Old Kingdom Egyptian". Nature. 644 (8077): 714–721. doi:10.1038/s41586-025-09195-5. ISSN 1476-4687. PMC 12367555. PMID 40604286.
