= Shaike =

Shaike or Shayke is a Jewish given name, a diminutive of Yehoshua or Yeshayahu. Notable people with the name include:

- Shaike Dan
- Shayke Frydman, birth name of Zosa Szajkowski, American hisrtoriaan
- Shaike Levi (born 1939), Israeli comedian, singer, and actor
- Shaike Ophir (1929–87), Israeli film actor and comedian
