= Dja'de el-Mughara =

Archaeological site

Dja'de el-Mughara is a Pre-Pottery Neolithic settlement in Northern Syria dating back to approximately 9000 BC. The settlement is located about 100 km northeast of the city of Aleppo and was being excavated from 1991 until 2011 when work on the site was forced to stop due to the Syrian civil war. Excavation of the site was led by Eric Coqueugniot of the French National Centre for Scientific Research.

== Archaeology ==
The first phase of the site was dated using a series of radiocarbon dates to 9300 - 8200 BC. These deposits were found below the layer that makes up phase two which has been dated to the 7000's BC based on ceramic finds. Then in the early Bronze Age, at the start of phase three the site was used as a necropolis and then abandoned completely.

In 2007 French Archaeologists discovered a 2 square metre mural on a wall inside the remains of a circular mudbrick building that was partially dug into the ground. The mural consisted of geometric shapes, mostly rectangles, colored in black and red on a white background. This building is thought to be a community building of some sort. Archaeologist Eric Coqueugniot stated that the painting looks akin to a modernist painting like the works of Paul Klee. This mural belongs to phase one and has been dated to around 9000 BC making it the oldest known painting on a constructed wall.

Other Pre-Pottery Neolithic finds from the site include animal bones, tools, a variety of figurines and ornaments, and human remains.

== The Settlement ==
The villagers of Dja'de el-Mughara were hunter-gatherers and their proximity to the Euphrates gave them access to a variety of plant resources as well as animals such as gazelles, Aurochs, and horses.

In the first phase the houses were large rectangular mudbrick buildings which were expanded in phase II while the large circular building that housed the mural was abandoned. Prior to phase III of the site, human remains were buried beneath the floor of the mudbrick buildings believed to be houses, similar to the site at Catalhoyuk. In phase three a building was used as a necropolis and the remains of more than 70 people were found inside. Some of the bones found in this necropolis exhibit signs of one of the earliest known cases of tuberculosis, the oldest being a 9000 year old case at the site of Atlit Yam.

== See also ==
- Mureybet
- Catalhoyuk
- History of Syria
