= Chaya tequila =

Brand of tequila

Chaya was a brand of tequila produced by Interco Brands Inc The product was produced from 100% Blue Agave.

== History ==
Chaya tequila was the brain child of Albert Berentsen, former president of Kahlúa S.A. It was manufactured from 100% Blue Agave at Industrializadora de Agave San Isidro. Unlike many tequila brands manufactured at the Industrializadora de Agave San Isidro production facility, Chaya was never wood barrel aged. Some reviews state this may preserve more of the natural fruity flavor of the Blue Agave plant. It was the first tequila to be included in gift bags at the MTV Movie Awards in 2006.

== Awards ==
- 2005 Exceptional Spirits Award - Beverage Tasting Institute
- 2005 Gold Medal - Chicago Testing Institute
- 2005-2006 Golden Icon Award - Travolta Family Entertainment
- 2006-2007 Golden Icon Award - Travolta Family Entertainment
- 2007-2008 Golden Icon Award - Travolta Family Entertainment
