= Shaya =

Shaya may refer to:

== People ==
=== Given name ===
- Shaya (singer) (born 1983), Greek singer
- Shaya al-Zindani (born 1954), Yemeni diplomat
- Shaya Boymelgreen (born 1951), American real estate developer
- Shaya Goldoust (born 1986), Iranian-born Canadian journalist, trans activist
- Shaya Goloshchyokin, birth name of Filipp Goloshchyokin, Soviet Bolshevik functionary

=== Surname ===
- Carol Shaya (born 1970), Israeli-born American former police officer, actress, and adult model
- George Shaya (born 1946), Rhodesian footballer

== Other ==
- Shaya FM, an Internet radio station
- Shaya, a male genie in Shimmer and Shine

== See also ==
- Chaya (disambiguation)
