= Chaya (literature) =

Chaya (Sanskrit: Chāyā) means 'shadow' or 'gloss', and is meant to provide better clarity on what the Prakrit words meant, and for resolving doubts about homonyms in Prakrit.

It was an ancient Indian tradition of providing Sanskrit glosses (transliterations) for Prakrit word forms, particularly in classical Indian drama plays.
