= Cayan =

U.S.-based payment processing company

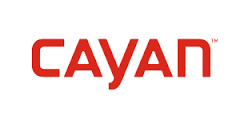
- Company type: Subsidiary
- Industry: Payment processor, Fintech
- Founded: Boston, Massachusetts (1998)
- Founder: Henry Helgeson
- Fate: Acquired by TSYS
- Headquarters: Boston, MA, United States
- Key people: Henry Helgeson (CEO and Founder)
- Parent: TSYS
- Website: www.cayan.com

Cayan (formerly Merchant Warehouse) is a provider of payment technologies and merchant services, based in Boston, Massachusetts. The company enables payments in physical stores and mobile locations, as well as e-commerce. Cayan was acquired by TSYS in December 2017 and operates as wholly owned subsidiary of TSYS.

Cayan ranks among the largest merchant acquirers in the United States. Clients vary in size from large-scale chains to small, one-location businesses. The company supports businesses of all industries, including restaurants and retail.

Cayan has won several industry awards, and was recognized for the early adoption and speed of its EMV technology.

== History ==
Cayan was founded as Merchant Warehouse in 1998 by current CEO Henry Helgeson. Helgeson was working as a payment terminal salesman in upstate New York, and realized the still-nascent Internet could allow him to sell terminals at much lower margins. He focused on early internet search engines like Alta Vista.

The company grew over the ensuing decades. In 2013, Cayan opened a technology development center in Belfast, Northern Ireland.

On December 18, 2017, it was announced that Cayan would be acquired by TSYS in an all-cash deal valuing the company at approximately $1.05 billion.

== Product ==
Cayan offers payment and payment processing solutions for online and brick-and-mortar retailers, as well as point-of-sale (POS) developers, value-added resellers (VARs) and agents. Their solutions can stand alone or complement point-of-sale systems.

The product line centers around its Genius platform, which exists in countertop, handheld, and mobile attachment forms. The platform is intended to allow retailers to use a suite of features while enabling tracking, reporting, and more across several channels.

Recently, Cayan’s Genius Smart P2PE solution was certified P2PE 2.0 compliant by the PCI Council. It is a validated Point to Point Encryption solution.

== Awards and recognition ==
Cayan has a vendor rating of "A+" with the Better Business Bureau. Cayan has also received a variety of industry awards, including Boston Business Journal Pacesetters Program: Boston's Fastest-Growing Private Companies (for six consecutive years), Business Solutions Magazine: Best Channel Vendor, Deloitte's Technology Fast 500™, Inc: Hire Power Award, MITX: Best Digital Innovation from a Large Enterprise, Stevie Awards: Best New Product or Service - Business-to-Business Products.

== Data Breach ==
Cayan was subject to a data breach in mid-November 2020, which included the personal data of approximately two hundred employees located in Northern Ireland. Parent company TSYS said that no customer card data was affected as it is processed by a separate system.
