= Göbekli Tepe =

Neolithic archaeological site in Turkey

- Girê Mirazan (Kurdish); Xirabreşkê (Kurdish)
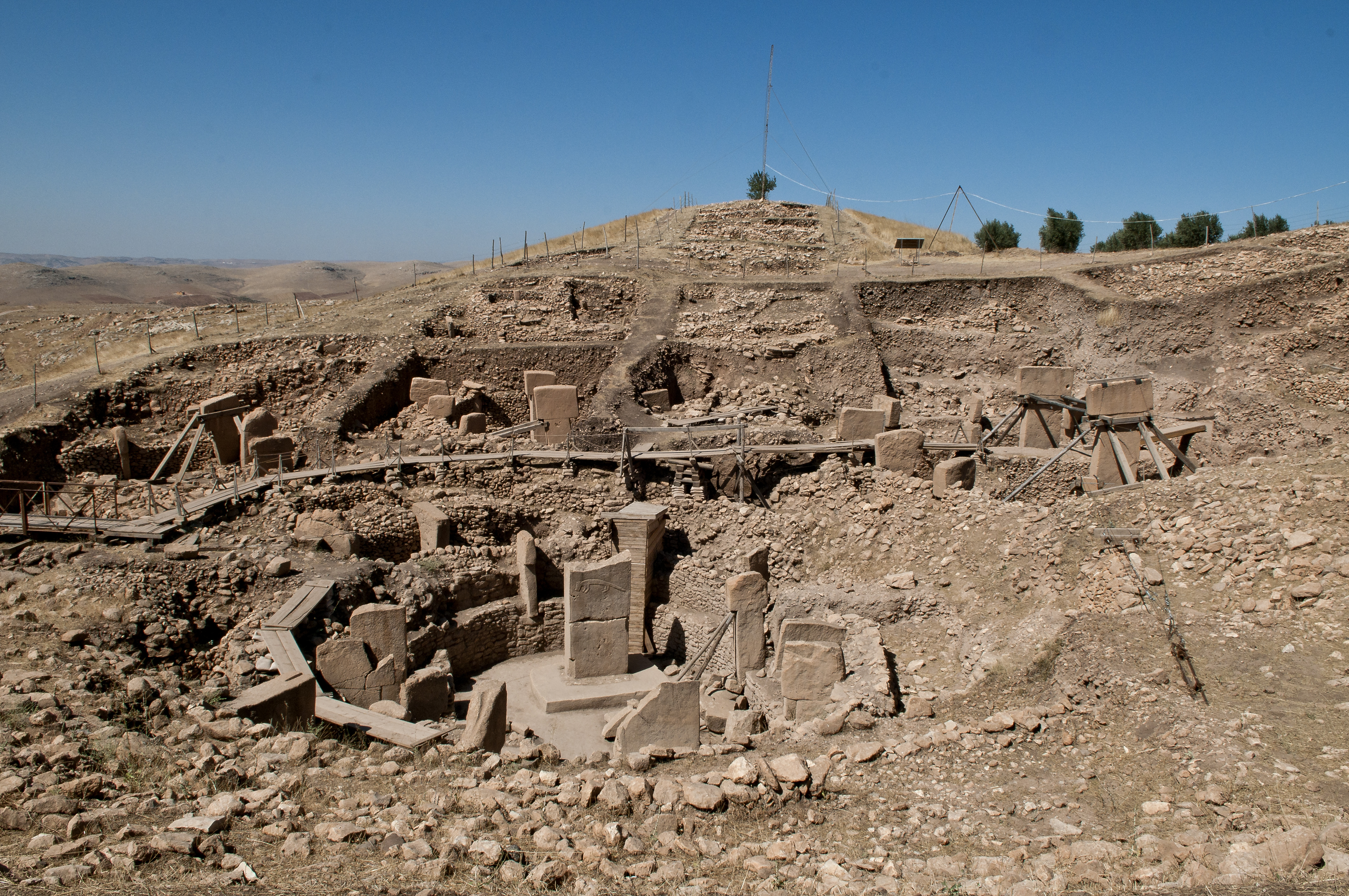
- Main excavation area

- Location within Turkey Location within Near East
- 37°13′25″N 38°55′18″E
- Type: Settlement
- Periods: Pre-Pottery Neolithic A; Pre-Pottery Neolithic B
- Location: Şanlıurfa Province, Turkey
- Region: Southeastern Anatolia

History
- Built: c. 9500 BCE (11450 BP)
- Abandoned: c. 8000 BCE (9950 BP)

Site notes
- Material: Limestone, Terrazzo (burnt lime), possibly wooden roof beams
- Excavation dates: 1995–present
- Archaeologists: Klaus Schmidt; Necmi Karul; Lee Clare
- Discovered: 1963
- Condition: Well-preserved
- Owner: Turkey
- Public access: Limited

UNESCO World Heritage Site
- Official name: Göbekli Tepe
- Type: Cultural
- Criteria: (i), (ii), (iv)
- Designated: 2018 (42nd session)
- Reference no.: 1572
- Region: Western Asia

Göbekli Tepe (pronounced ɟœbecˈli teˈpe meaning 'Potbelly Hill') is a Neolithic archaeological site in Upper Mesopotamia (al-Jazira) in modern-day Turkey. The settlement was inhabited from around 9500 BCE to at least 8000 BCE, during the Pre-Pottery Neolithic. It is known for its large circular structures that contain large stone pillars – among the world's oldest known megaliths. Many of these pillars are decorated with anthropomorphic details, clothing, and sculptural reliefs of wild animals, providing archaeologists with insights into prehistoric religion and the iconography of the period. The 15 m (50 ft) high, 8 ha (20-acre) tell is covered with ancient domestic structures and other small buildings, quarries, and stone-cut cisterns from the Neolithic, as well as traces of activity from later periods.

The site was first used at the dawn of the southwest Asian Neolithic period, which marked the appearance of the oldest permanent human settlements anywhere in the world. Prehistorians link this Neolithic Revolution to the advent of agriculture but disagree on whether farming caused people to settle down or vice versa. Göbekli Tepe, a monumental complex built on a rocky mountaintop with no clear evidence of agricultural cultivation, has played a prominent role in this debate.

Findings published in 2019 suggest a settlement at Göbekli Tepe, with domestic structures, extensive cereal processing, a water supply, and tools associated with daily life. This contrasts with a previous interpretation of the site as a sanctuary used by nomads, with few or no permanent inhabitants. No definitive purpose has been determined for the megalithic structures, which have been popularly described as the "world's first temple[s]". They were likely roofed and appear to have regularly collapsed, been inundated by landslides, and subsequently repaired or rebuilt. The architecture and iconography are similar to other contemporary sites in the vicinity, such as Karahan Tepe.

The site was first noted in a 1963 archaeological survey. German archaeologist Klaus Schmidt recognised its significance in 1994 and began excavations there the following year. After he died in 2014, work continued as a joint project of Istanbul University, Şanlıurfa Museum, and the German Archaeological Institute, under the direction of Turkish prehistorian Necmi Karul. Göbekli Tepe was designated a UNESCO World Heritage Site in 2018, recognising its outstanding universal value as "one of the first manifestations of human-made monumental architecture". As of 2021, around 10% of the site has been excavated. Additional areas were examined by geophysical surveys, which showed the mound to contain at least 20 large enclosures.

== Geography and environment ==
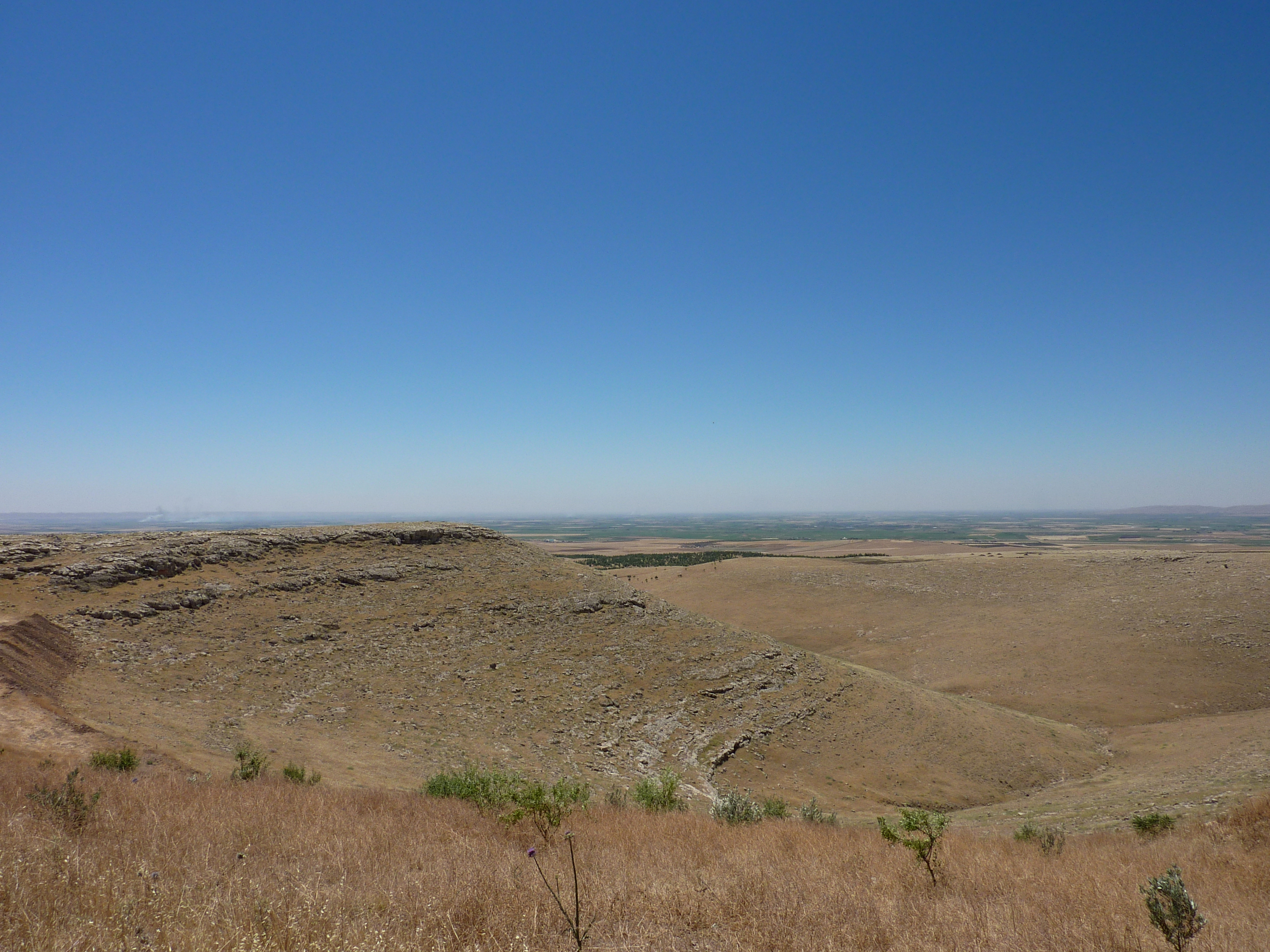
Present day landscape around Göbekli Tepe

Göbekli Tepe is near the village of Örencik in Şanliurfa Province in the Taş Tepeler ('Stone Hills'), in the foothills of the Taurus Mountains. It overlooks the Harran plain and the headwaters of the Balikh River, a tributary of the Euphrates. The site is a tell (artificial mound) on a flat limestone plateau. In the north, a narrow promontory connects the plateau to the neighbouring mountains. The ridge descends steeply into slopes and cliffs in all other directions.

The climate of the area was wetter when Göbekli Tepe was occupied than it is today. The site was surrounded by an open steppe grassland, with abundant wild cereals, including einkorn, wheat, and barley, and herds of grazing animals such as wild sheep, wild goat, gazelle, and equids. Large herds of goitered gazelle may have passed by the site in seasonal migrations. There is no evidence of substantial woodlands nearby; 90% of the charcoal recovered at the site was from pistachio or almond trees.

Like most Pre-Pottery Neolithic (PPN) sites in the Urfa region, Göbekli Tepe was built at a high point on the edge of the mountains, giving it a wide view over the plain beneath and good visibility from the plain. This location also gave the builders good access to raw material: the soft limestone bedrock from which the complex was built and the flint to make the tools to work the limestone. The prehistoric village acquired drinking water through a rainwater harvesting system, consisting of carved channels that fed several cisterns carved into the bedrock under the site, which could hold at least 150 cubic metres (5,300 cu ft) of water. Additionally, the local water table may have been higher, activating springs closer to the site that are dormant today.

Excavations have taken place at the southern slope of the tell, south, and west of a mulberry that marks an Islamic pilgrimage, but archaeological finds come from the entire plateau. The team also found many tools that remain. At the western escarpment, a small cave was discovered, and a small relief depicting a bovid was found. It is the only relief found in this cave.

== Dawn of village life ==
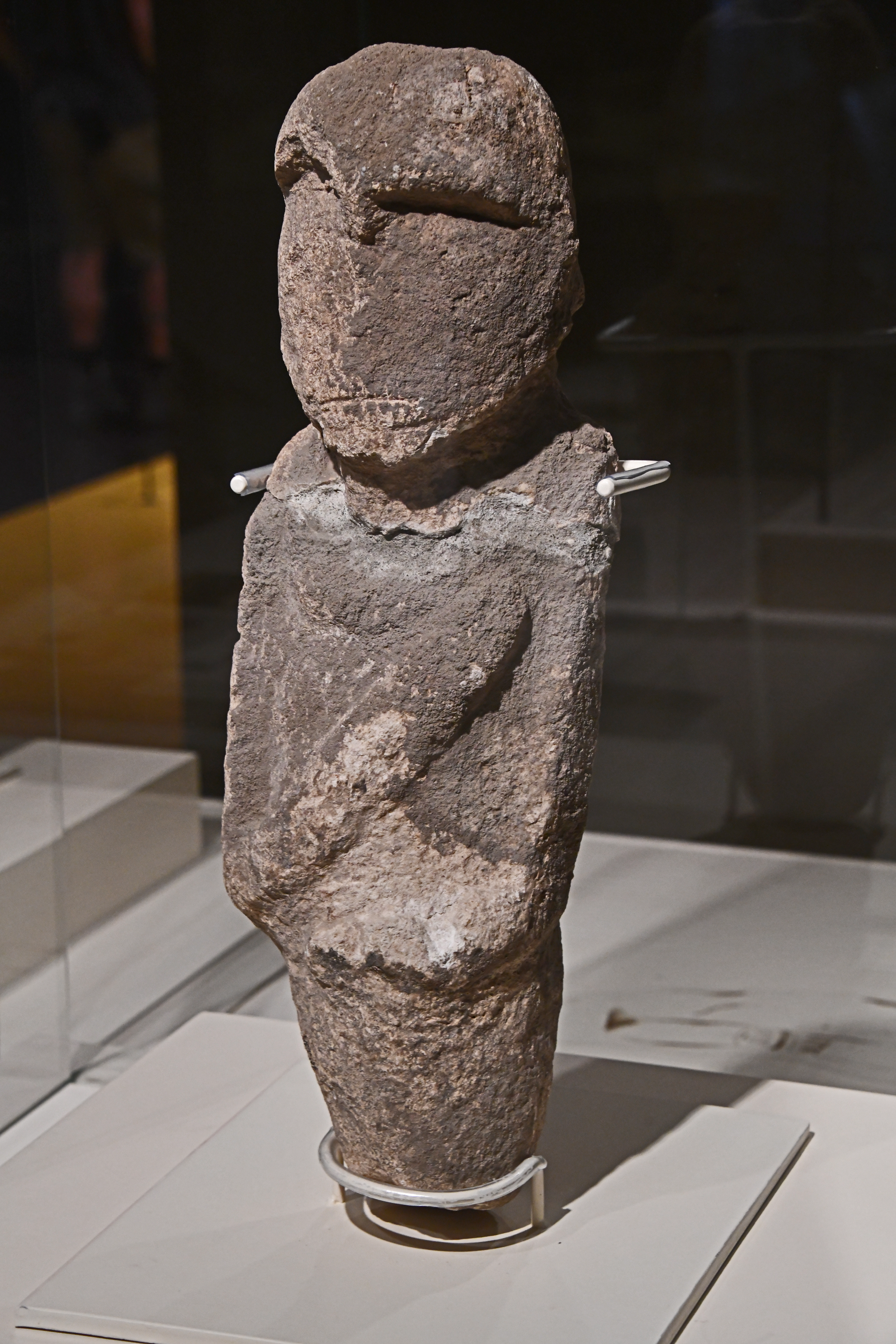
Göbekli Tepe human statue. Urfa Museum

Göbekli Tepe was built and occupied during the earliest part of the Southwest Asian Neolithic, known as the Pre-Pottery Neolithic (PPN, c. 9600–7000 BCE). Beginning at the end of the last Ice Age, the PPN marks "the beginnings of village life", producing the earliest evidence for permanent human settlements in the world. One of the earliest known sites is Körtik Tepe, dated to 10,700–9250 BCE, which may have been a predecessor of the PPN artistic and material culture in Upper Mesopotamia, including Göbekli Tepe and the other Taş Tepeler sites.

Archaeologists have long associated the appearance of these settlements with the Neolithic Revolution—the transition from hunting and gathering to agriculture—but disagree on whether the adoption of farming caused people to settle down, or settling down caused people to adopt farming. Despite the name, the Neolithic Revolution in Southwest Asia was "drawn out and locally variable". Elements of village life appeared as early as 10,000 years before the Neolithic in places, and the transition to agriculture took thousands of years, with different paces and trajectories in different regions. Archaeologists divide the Pre-Pottery Neolithic into two subperiods: the Pre-Pottery Neolithic A (PPNA, c. 9600–8800 BCE) and the Pre-Pottery Neolithic B (PPNB, c. 8800 and 7000 BCE). The earliest phases at Göbekli Tepe have been dated to the PPNA; later phases to the PPNB.

Evidence indicates the inhabitants of Göbekli Tepe were hunter-gatherers who supplemented their diet with early forms of domesticated cereal and lived in villages for at least part of the year. Tools such as grinding stones, mortars, and pestles found at the site have been analysed and suggest considerable cereal processing. Archaeozoological evidence hints at "large-scale hunting of gazelle between midsummer and autumn."

PPN villages consisted mainly of clusters of stone or mud brick houses, but sometimes also substantial monuments and large buildings. These include the tower and walls at Tell es-Sultan (Jericho), as well as large, roughly contemporaneous circular buildings at Göbekli Tepe, Nevalı Çori, Çayönü, Wadi Feynan 16, Jerf el-Ahmar, Tell 'Abr 3, and Tepe Asiab. Archaeologists typically associate these structures with communal activities which, together with the communal effort needed to build them, helped to maintain social interactions in PPN communities as they grew in size.

The T-shaped pillar tradition seen at Göbekli Tepe is unique to the Urfa region but is found at most PPN sites. These include Nevalı Çori, Hamzan Tepe, Karahan Tepe, Harbetsuvan Tepesi, Sefer Tepe, and Taslı Tepe. Other stone stelae—without the characteristic T shape—have been documented at contemporary sites further afield, including Çayönü, Qermez Dere, and Gusir Höyük.

Known PPN sites in the Urfa region. Sites with T-shaped pillars are marked with.

== Chronology ==
Radiocarbon dating shows that the earliest exposed structures at Göbekli Tepe were built between 9500 and 9000 BCE, towards the end of the Pre-Pottery Neolithic A (PPNA) period. The site was significantly expanded in the early 9th millennium BCE and remained in use until around 8000 BCE, or perhaps slightly later (the early Pre-Pottery Neolithic B, PPNB). There is evidence that smaller groups returned to live amongst the ruins after the Neolithic structures were abandoned.

Schmidt originally dated the site to the PPN based on the types of stone tools found there, considering a PPNA date "most probable". Establishing its absolute chronology took longer because of methodological challenges. Though the first two radiocarbon dates were published in 1998, these and other samples from the fill of the structure dated to the late 10th and early 9th millennium—500 to 1,000 years later than expected for a PPNA site. Schmidt's team explained the discrepancy in light of their theory that this material was brought to the site from elsewhere when it was abandoned, and so was not representative of the actual use of the structures. They instead turned to a novel method of dating organic material preserved in the plaster on the structure's walls, which resulted in dates more consistent with a PPNA occupation, in the middle or even early 10th millennium BCE. Subsequent research led to a significant revision of Schmidt's chronology, including the abandonment of the hypothesis that the fill of the structures was brought from elsewhere, and a recognition that direct dates on plaster are affected by the old wood effect. Together with new radiocarbon dates, this has established the site's absolute chronology as falling in the period 9500 to 8000 BCE – the late PPNA and PPNB.

=== Building phases ===
The preliminary, later abandoned, stratigraphic model by Klaus Schmidt consisted of three architectural layers. The large circular enclosures were attributed to Layer III, dated to the 10th millennium BCE (PPNA). The smaller rectangular structures and the abandonment of the site were assigned to Layer II in the 9th millennium BCE (early to middle PPNB). Layer I consisted of all post-Neolithic activities up to the modern surface.

The revised chronology consists of eight phases that span at least 1,500 years. It details the history of the large circular enclosures, including events that led to their alteration or abandonment, and the evolution of the domestic buildings surrounding them.

- Phase 1: The earliest settlement phase dates to the second half of the 10th millennium BCE and includes the first versions of enclosures A to D and round-oval domestic structures, which indicate a (semi) sedentary lifestyle.
- Phase 2: In the second phase (early 9th millennium BCE), significant modifications of enclosures A–D were undertaken: New walls were erected, which incorporated the first monolithic T-shaped pillars. An increasing number of domestic structures were built, still mostly oval-round, though with a rising tendency for a rectangular floor plan.
- Phases 3–5: In the early PPNB, the northern and western slopes saw the erection of rectangular (domestic) structures. They underwent multiple construction phases, such as adding benches with a T-shaped pillar and new inner walls, resulting in more rectangular rooms. The large enclosures were modified as well. Walls were repaired, and new ones were added. Benches were placed against the interior sides of phase 2 walls.
  At the end of the early PPNB, a slope slide inundated the lower-lying structures, flushing sediments and domestic rubble (likely including midden and burials) downhill. This caused extensive damage to enclosure D and led to stabilisation works in Phase 5. Building C was reconstructed for the last time, and a terrace wall was placed above it to prevent future slope slides. Nonetheless, a second major slope-slide event occurred, which likely resulted in enclosure D being abandoned in the late 9th millennium BCE.
- Phases 6 and 7: Building activity gradually declined in phases 6 and 7 (late 9th to early 8th millennium BCE). The loss of enclosures B and D may have led to the construction of building G and the "Lion Pillar Building". In Phase 7, another terrace wall was constructed in a last attempt to stabilise the northern slope.
- Phase 8: In the final occupation period, small habitation structures were built within the remains of the abandoned Neolithic village.

== Architecture ==
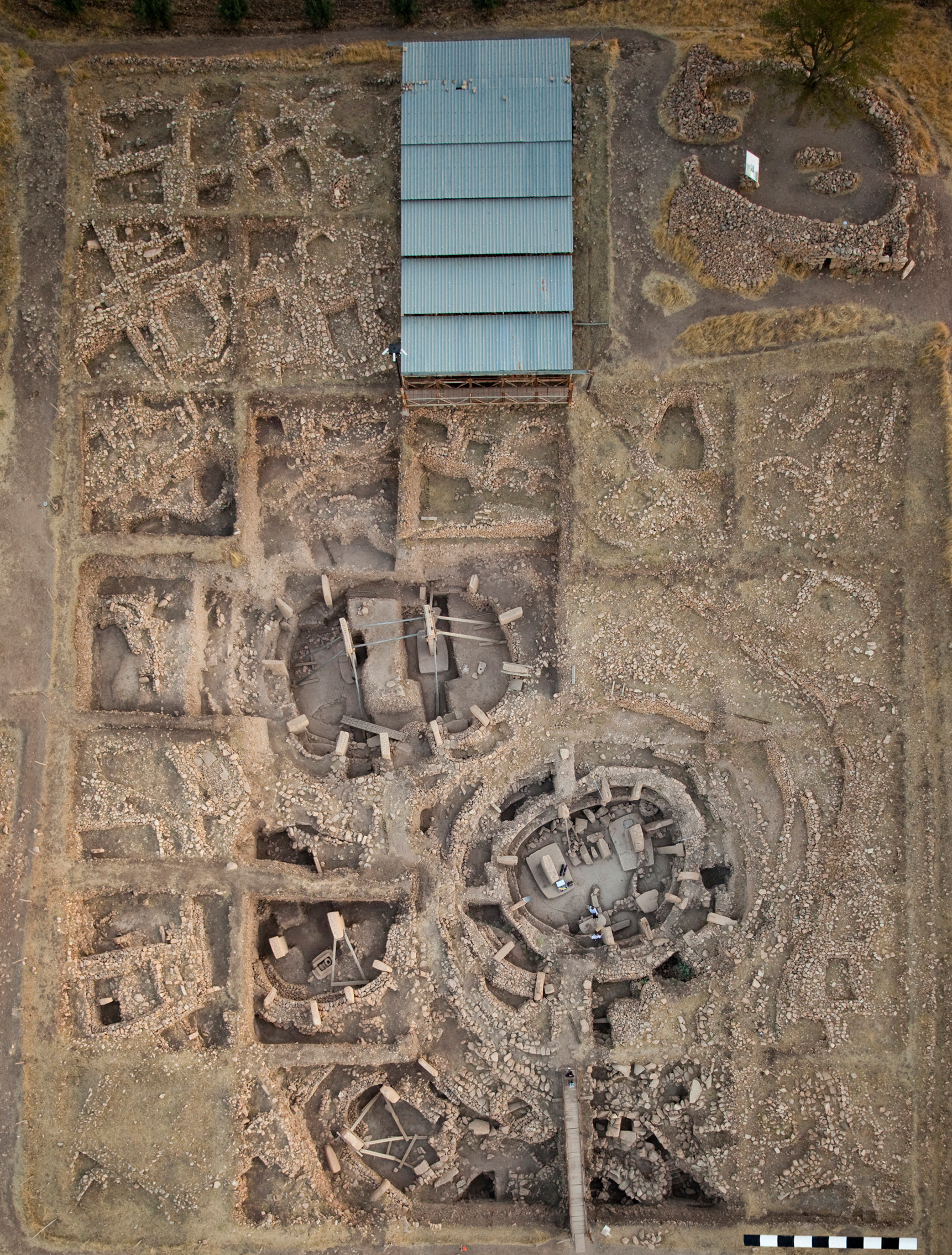
Aerial view of the main excavation area, showing circular enclosures A, B, C and D and a number of rectangular structures

=== Large enclosures ===
The first circular compounds appear around the latter half of the 10th millennium BCE. They range from 10 to 30 m (33 to 98 ft) in diameter. Their most notable feature is the T-shaped limestone pillars evenly set within thick interior walls of unworked stone. Four such circular structures have been unearthed so far. Geophysical surveys indicate that there are 16 more, enclosing up to eight pillars each, amounting to nearly 200. The slabs were transported from bedrock pits about 100 m (330 ft) from the hilltop, with workers using flint points to cut through the limestone bedrock. The pillars are the oldest known megaliths in the world.

Two taller pillars stand facing one another at the centre of each circle. Whether the circles were provided with a roof is uncertain. Stone benches designed for sitting are found in the interior. Many of the pillars are decorated with abstract, enigmatic pictograms and carved animal reliefs. The pictograms may represent commonly understood sacred symbols, as known from Neolithic cave paintings elsewhere. The reliefs depict mammals such as lions, bulls, boars, foxes, gazelle, and donkeys; snakes and other reptiles; arthropods such as insects and arachnids; and birds, particularly vultures. Vultures also feature prominently in the iconography of Çatalhöyük and Jericho.

Few humanoid figures have appeared in the art at Göbekli Tepe. Some of the T-shaped pillars have human arms carved on their lower half; however, this suggested to site excavator Schmidt that they were intended to represent the bodies of stylised humans (or perhaps deities). Loincloths appear on the lower half of a few pillars. Schmidt thought the horizontal stone slab on top symbolised shoulders, which suggests that the figures were left headless. Whether they were intended to serve as surrogate worshippers, to symbolise venerated ancestors, or to represent supernatural, anthropomorphic beings is unknown.

Some of the floors in this, the oldest layer, are made of terrazzo (burnt lime); others are the bedrock from which pedestals hold the large pair of central pillars, which were carved in high relief. Radiocarbon dating places the construction of these early circles c. 9000 BCE.

Later enclosures were rectangular, perhaps to make more efficient use of space compared with circular structures. They often are associated with the emergence of the Neolithic, but the T-shaped pillars, the main feature of the older enclosures, also are present here, indicating that the buildings continued to serve the same function in the culture, during the Pre-Pottery Neolithic B (PPNB). The adjoining rectangular, doorless, and windowless rooms have polished lime floors reminiscent of Roman terrazzo floors. Carbon dating has yielded dates between 8800 and 8000 BCE. Several T-pillars up to 1.5 metres tall occupy the centre of the rooms. A pair decorated with fierce-looking lions is the rationale for the name "lion pillar building" by which their enclosure is known.

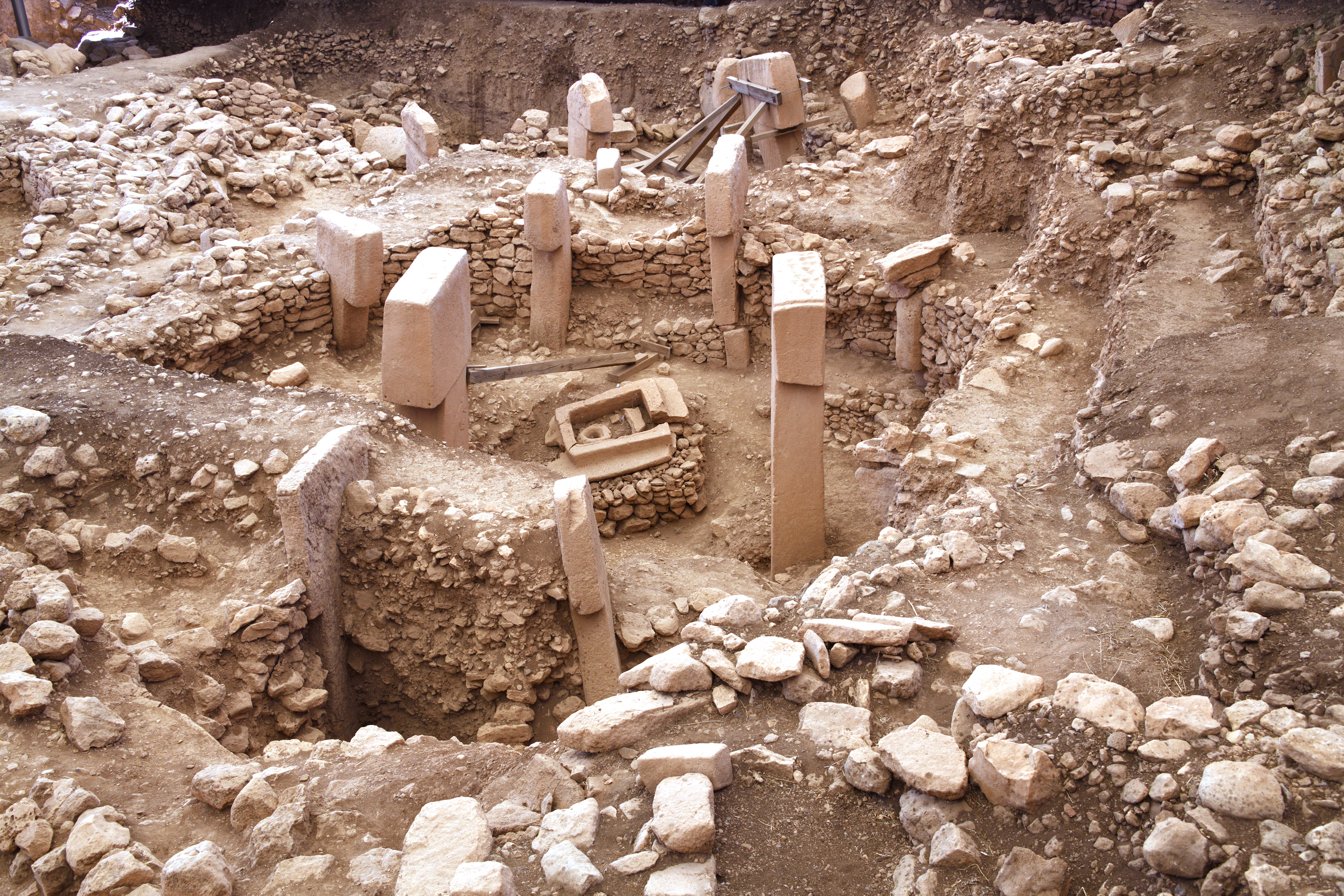
Enclosure B

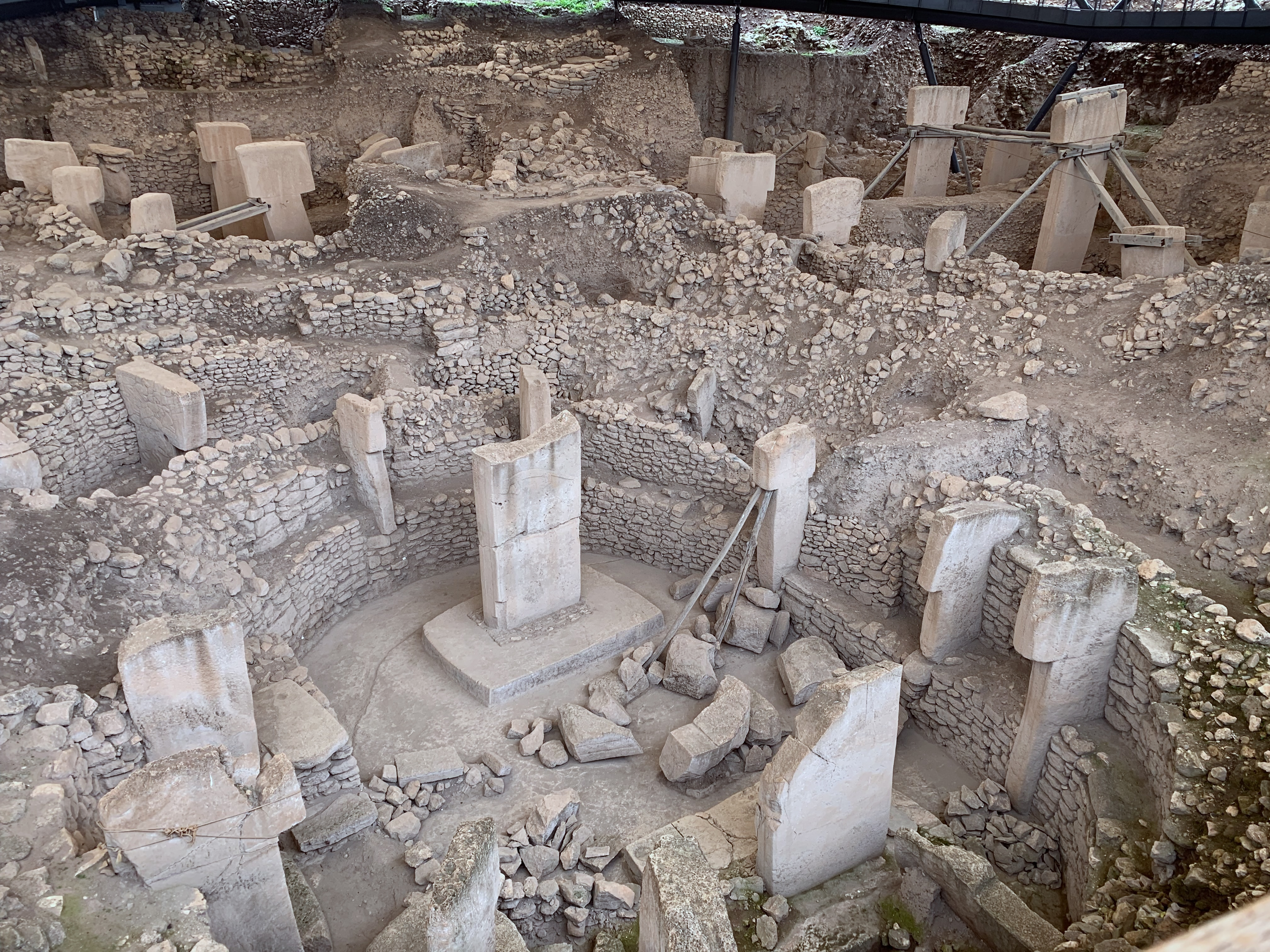
Enclosure C

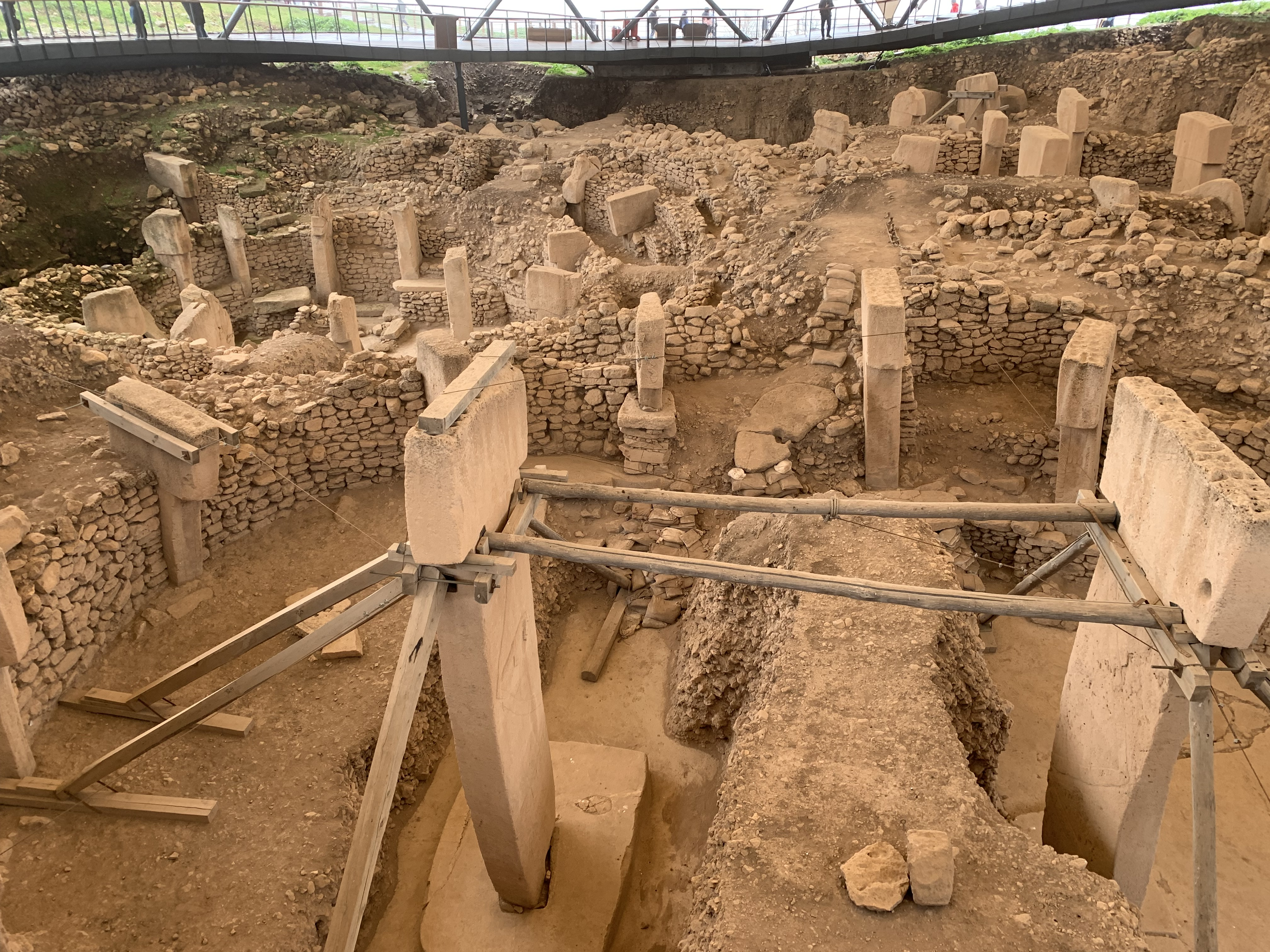
Enclosure F

=== Domestic structures ===
In the earliest occupation phase, round-oval domestic structures were built alongside the large enclosures, which indicates a (semi) sedentary lifestyle. Over time, there was an increasing tendency for these buildings to have rectangular floor plans. In the final settlement phase, only small structures were erected.

=== Burials ===
Before any burials were found, Schmidt speculated that graves could have been located in niches behind the walls of the circular building. In 2017, fragments of human crania with incisions were discovered at the site, interpreted as a manifestation of the widespread Neolithic skull cult. Special preparation of human crania in the form of plastered human skulls is known from the Pre-Pottery Neolithic period at Levantine sites such as Tell es-Sultan (also known as Jericho), Tell Aswad, and Yiftahel, and later in Anatolia at Çatalhöyük.

=== Other structures ===
At the western edge of the hill, a lionlike figure was found. Flint and limestone fragments occur more frequently in this part of the site, on which basis it has been suggested that this area could have held a sculpture workshop. It is unclear, on the other hand, how to classify three phallic depictions from the surface of the southern plateau. They are near the quarries of classical times, making their dating difficult.

Apart from the tell, there is an incised platform with two sockets that could have held pillars and a flat bench surrounding it. This platform corresponds to the oldest parts of the tell. Continuing the naming pattern, it is called "complex E". Owing to its similarity to the cult buildings at Nevalı Çori, it has also been called the "Temple of the Rock". Its floor has been carefully hewn out of the bedrock and smoothed, reminiscent of the terrazzo floors of the younger complexes at Göbekli Tepe. Immediately northwest of this area are two cistern-like pits that are believed to be part of complex E. One of these pits has a table-high pin and a staircase with five steps.

== Construction ==
The plateau on which Göbekli Tepe stands has been shaped by erosion and quarrying from the Neolithic onwards. There are four 10-metre-long (33 ft) and 20-centimetre-wide (7.9 in) channels on the southern part of the plateau, interpreted as the remains of an ancient quarry from which rectangular blocks were taken. These are possibly related to a square building in the neighbourhood, of which only the foundation is preserved. Perhaps this is the remains of a Roman watchtower that was part of the Limes Arabicus. Most structures on the plateau seem to result from Neolithic quarrying, with the quarries being used as sources for the huge, monolithic architectural elements. Their profiles were pecked into the rock, with the detached blocks, then levered out of the rock bank.

Archaeologists disagree on how much labour was needed to construct the site. Schmidt maintained that "the work of quarrying, transporting, and erecting tons of heavy, monolithic, and almost universally well-prepared limestone pillars [...] was not within the capability of a few people". Using Thor Heyerdahl's experiments with the moai of Rapa Nui as a reference, he estimated that moving the pillars alone must have involved hundreds of people. According to these experiments, one moai of similar size to a T-shaped pillar from Göbekli Tepe would have taken 20 people a year to carve and 50–75 people a week to transport 15 km. Schmidt's team has also cited a 1917 account of the construction of a megalith on the Indonesian island of Nias, which took 525 people three days. These estimates underpin their interpretation that the site was built by a large, non-resident workforce, coerced or enticed there by a small religious elite. However, others estimate that just 7–14 people could have moved the pillars using ropes and water or another lubricant, with techniques used to construct other monuments such as Stonehenge. Experiments at Göbekli Tepe itself have suggested that all the PPNB structures exposed could have been built by 12–24 people in less than four months, allowing for time spent quarrying stone and gathering, and preparing food. These labour estimates are thought to be within the capability of a single extended family or village community in the Neolithic. They also match the number of people that could have comfortably been inside one of the buildings simultaneously.

Enclosures B, C, and D were initially planned as a single, hierarchical complex that forms an equilateral triangle, according to Haklay and Gopher.

=== Landslides and reconstruction ===
The enclosures, lying over 10 metres (33 ft) below the highest areas of the settlement, suffered several landslides during the occupation period of Göbekli Tepe. A particularly severe one occurred at the end of the early PPNB, which inundated enclosure D with rubble of domestic structures and sediments, including burials and midden deposits. This caused severe damage to the enclosure, leading to repairs and stabilisation work. At a later point, in Building Phase 5, terrace walls were erected, likely to prevent future damage from such events. However, these measures proved futile when a second major landslide probably caused the enclosure to be abandoned during Building Phase 6, around the late 9th millennium BCE. Other enclosures suffered a similar fate, which might have led to new enclosures being constructed to replace them.

Previously, it had been assumed that the large enclosures were intentionally back-filled, an interpretation that has fallen out of favour since Klaus Schmidt's death.

== Tools ==
Göbekli Tepe is littered with flint artifacts, from the ridge-top site to the slopes. The tool assemblage found resembles that of other Northern Levantine Pre-Pottery Neolithic (settlement) sites.

In 1963, over 3,000 Neolithic tools were uncovered, the vast majority of excellent quality flint, only a handful of obsidian. Cores, various blades, flakes, scrapers, burins, and projectile points, were the most common tool types.

Excavations of Space 16, a small building adjacent to enclosure D, yielded almost 700 tools. Most common were retouched artifacts, followed by scrapers, perforators, and artifacts with gloss. Heavy duty tools, burins and microliths were also present.

Over 7,000 grinding stones have been found, spanning the entirety of the site's usage, which are suggested to have been used to process cereal based on phytoliths found in associated soil. However, it is unclear whether the cereal was wild or cultivated.

== Iconography ==
=== Pillars ===
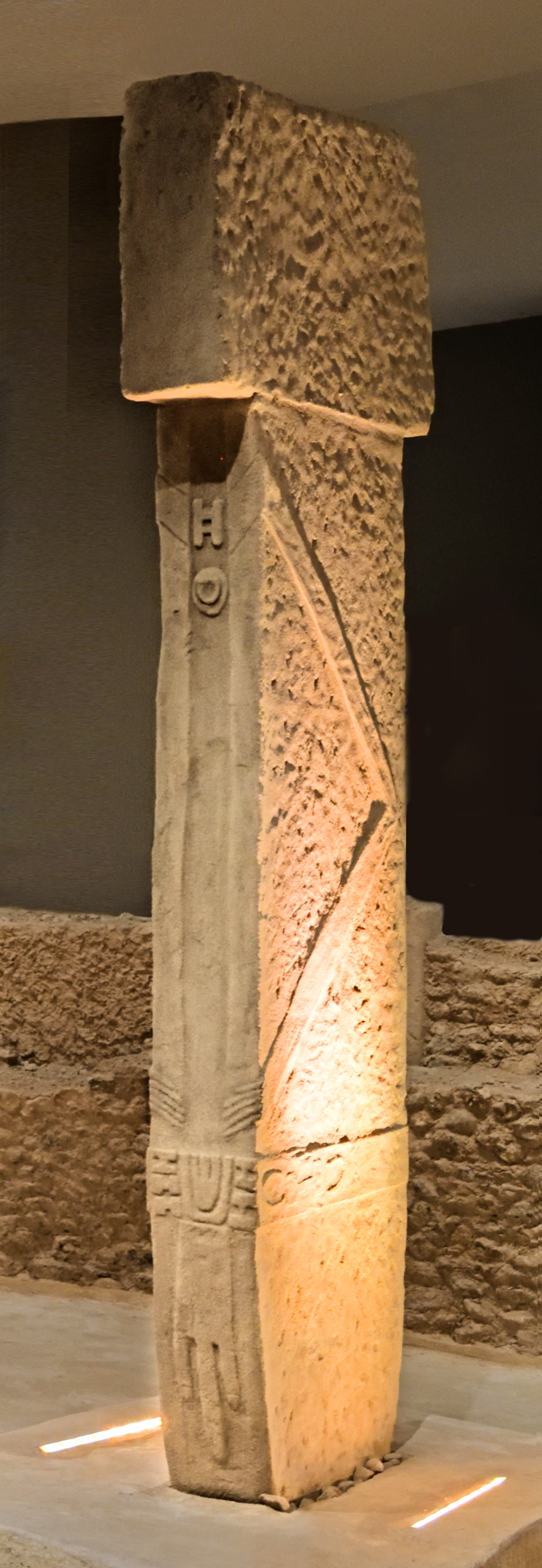
Reproduction of a central pillar of Enclosure D in the Şanlıurfa museum: engraved side arms with hands, and a belt with loincloth.

The stone pillars in the enclosures at Göbekli Tepe are T-shaped, similar to other Pre-Pottery Neolithic sites in the region. Unlike at these other sites, however, many of the pillars are carved—typically in low relief, though sometimes in high relief. Most carvings depict animals, mostly serpents, foxes, and boars, but also gazelle, mouflon (wild sheep), onager, ducks, and vultures. Insofar as they can be identified, the animals are male and often depicted with an aggressive posture.

Abstract shapes are also depicted as upright or horizontal H-shaped symbols, crescents, and disks. Depictions of humans are rare; pillar 43 in enclosure D includes a headless man with an erect phallus. Other phallic figures have been discovered on the site, as well as in other Taş Tepeler sites. However, the T-shape of the pillars themselves is anthropomorphic: the shaft is the body, and the top is the head. This is confirmed by the fact that some pillars include—in addition to animal reliefs—carvings of arms, hands, and loincloths.

The two central pillars occupied a special place in the symbolic architecture of the enclosures. Those in Enclosure D represent humans, with arms, a belt, and a piece of cloth that hides the genitals. The sex of the individuals depicted cannot be identified, though Schmidt suggested that they are two men because the belts they wear are a male attribute in the period. There is only one certain representation of a woman, depicted naked on a slab.

Schmidt and zooarchaeologist Joris Peters have argued that the variety of animals depicted on the pillars means they likely do not express a single iconography. They suggest that, since many of the animals pictured are predators, the stones may have been intended to stave off evils through some form of magic representation or served as totems.

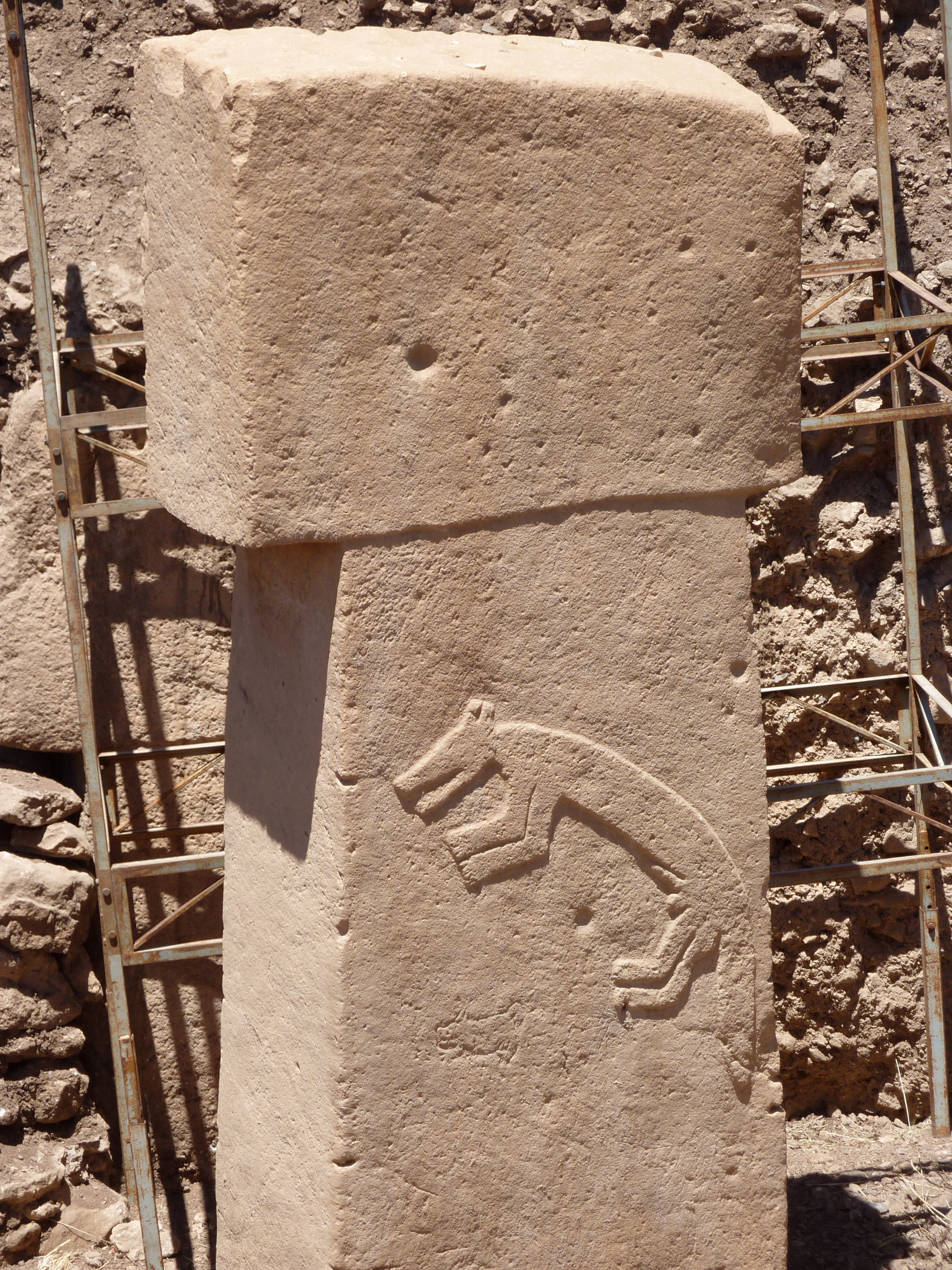
Pillar 10, Enclosure B: fox

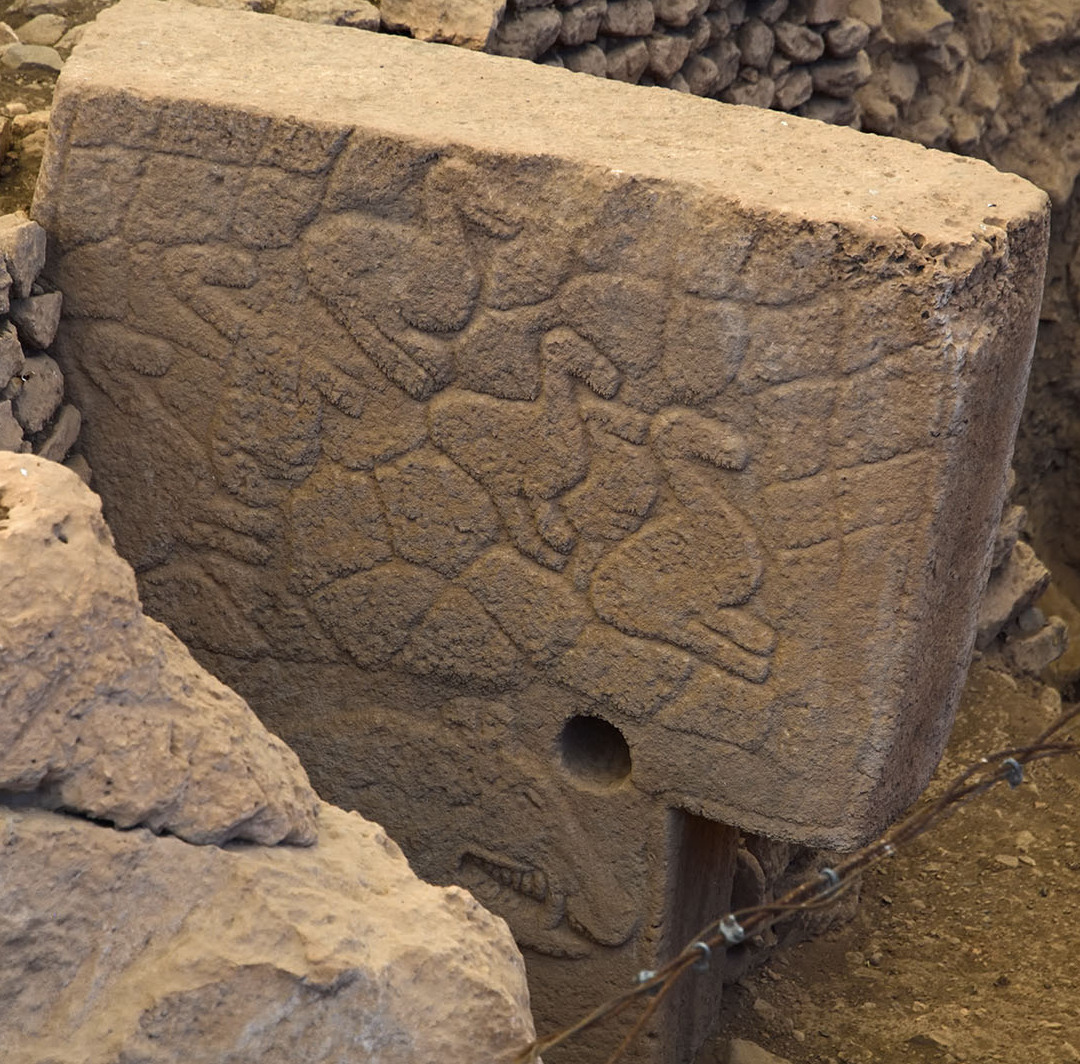
Pillar 12, Enclosure C: ducks and boar

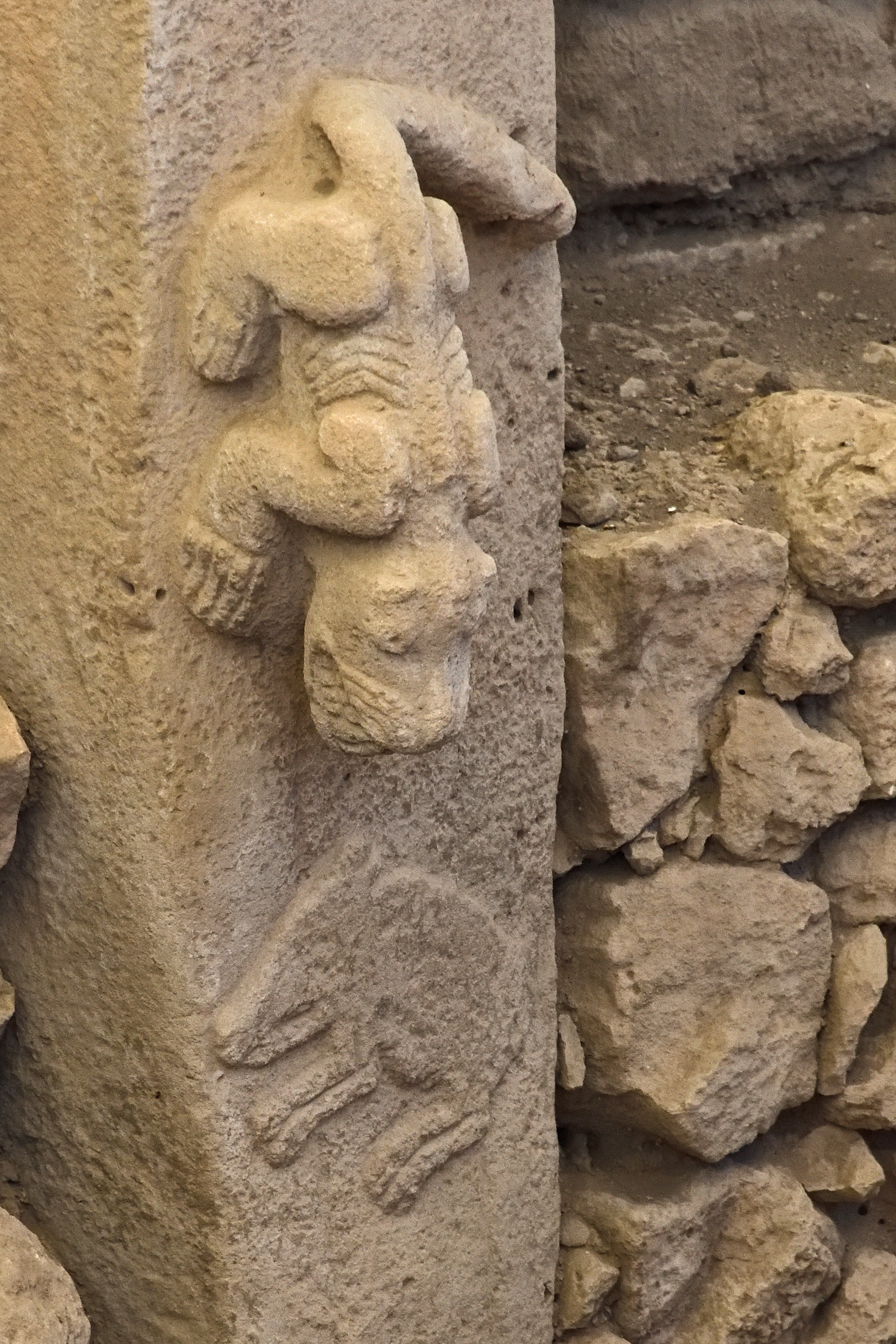
Pillar 27, Enclosure C: predator (perhaps a felid) hunting a boar.

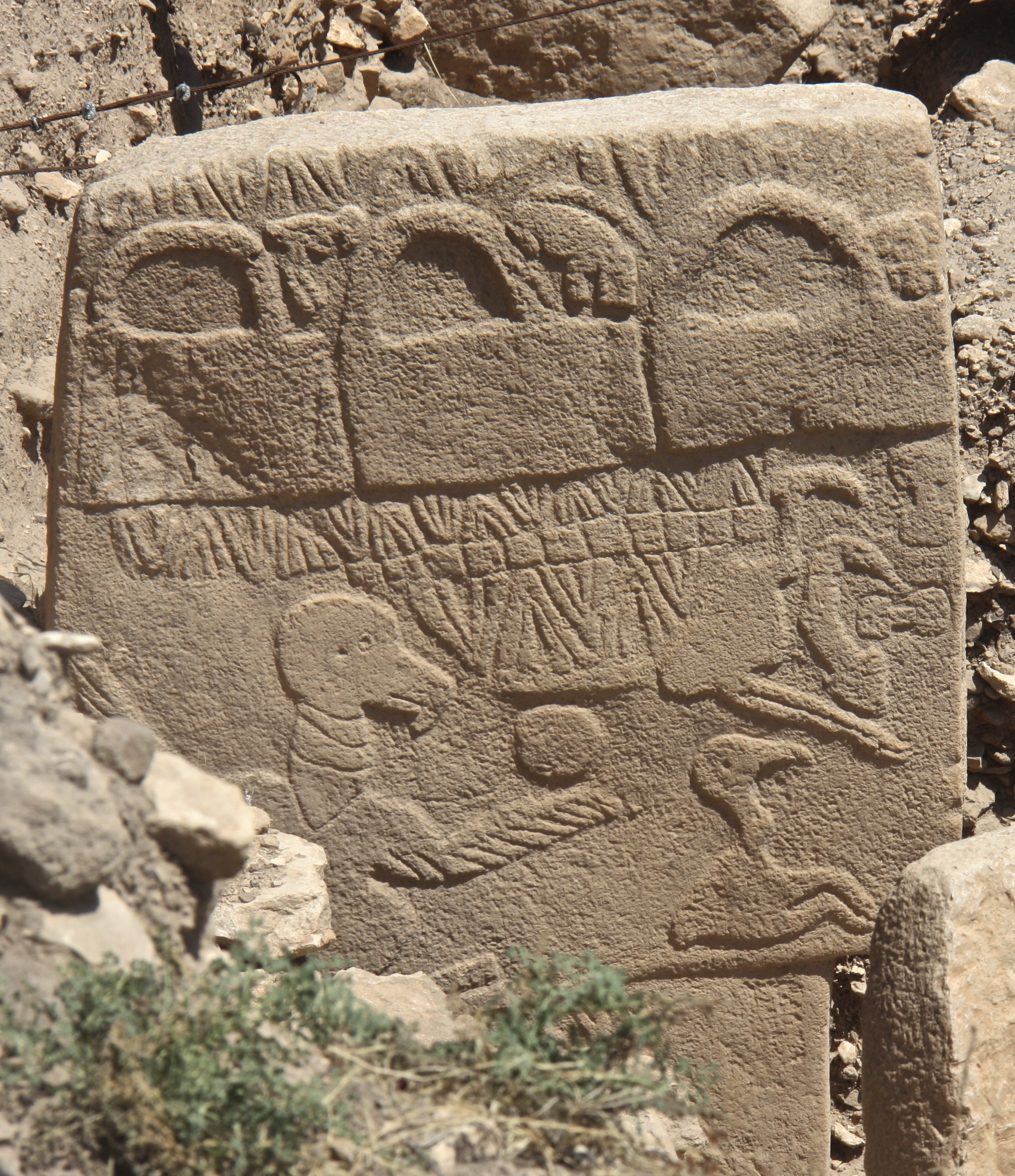
Pillar 43, Enclosure D: the "Vulture Stone"

=== Other objects ===
The structures at Göbekli Tepe have also yielded some smaller carved stones, which typically cannot be attributed to one period or another. The iconography of these objects is similar to that of the pillars, mostly depicting animals but also humans, again mostly male.

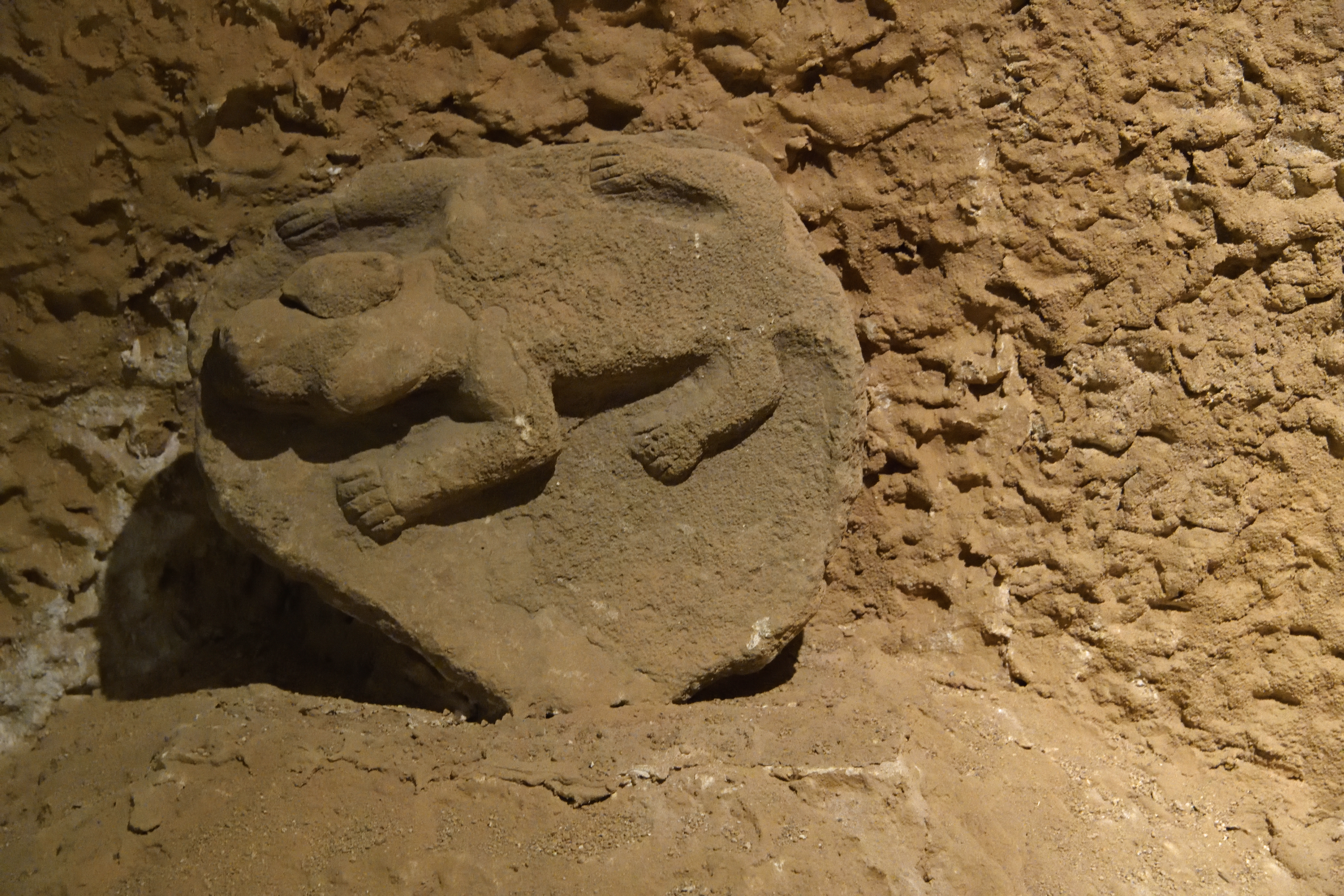
Carved stone with animal (possibly a reptile, felid, or wolverine) in high relief

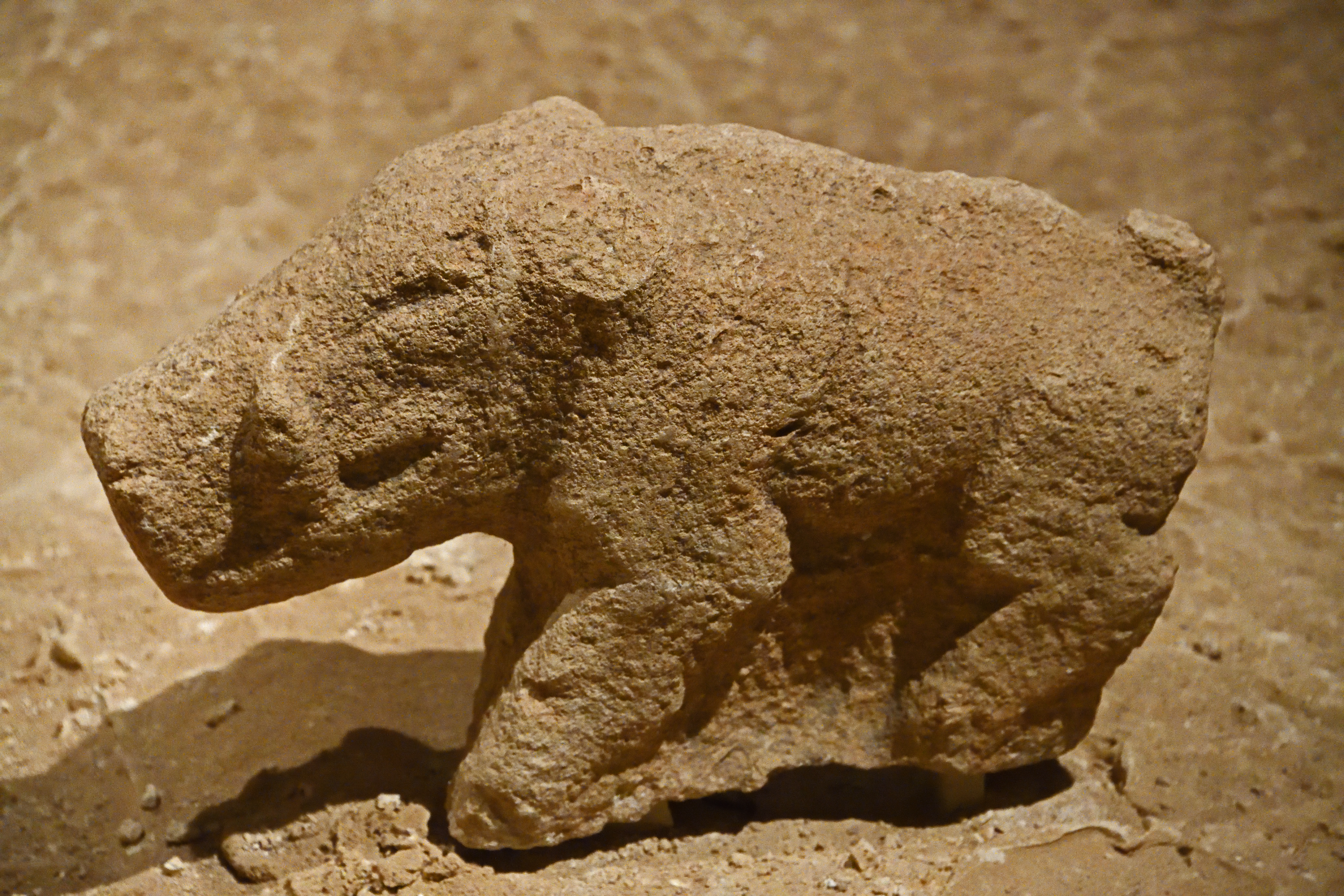
Boar statuette with legs

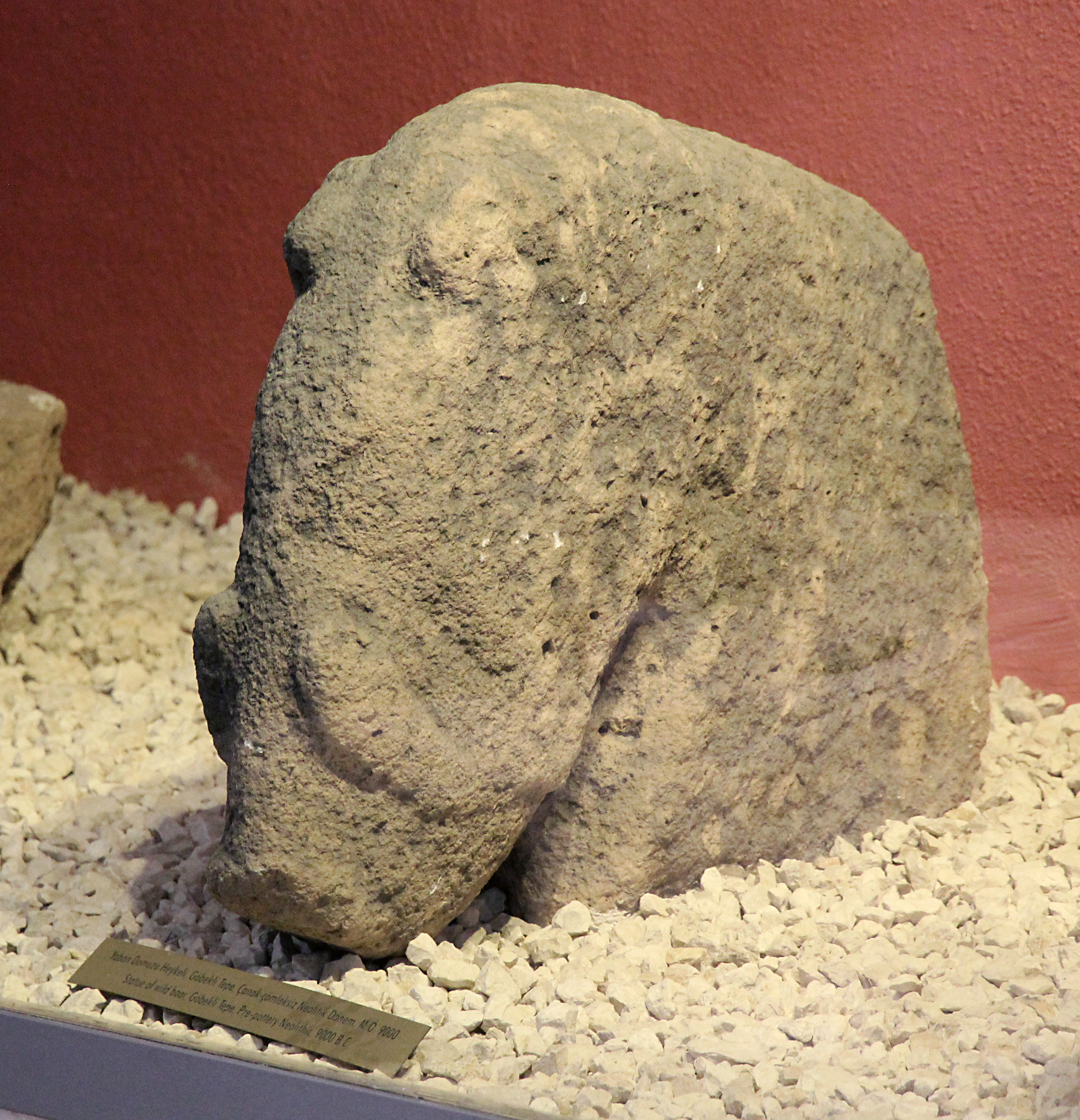
Boar statuette without legs

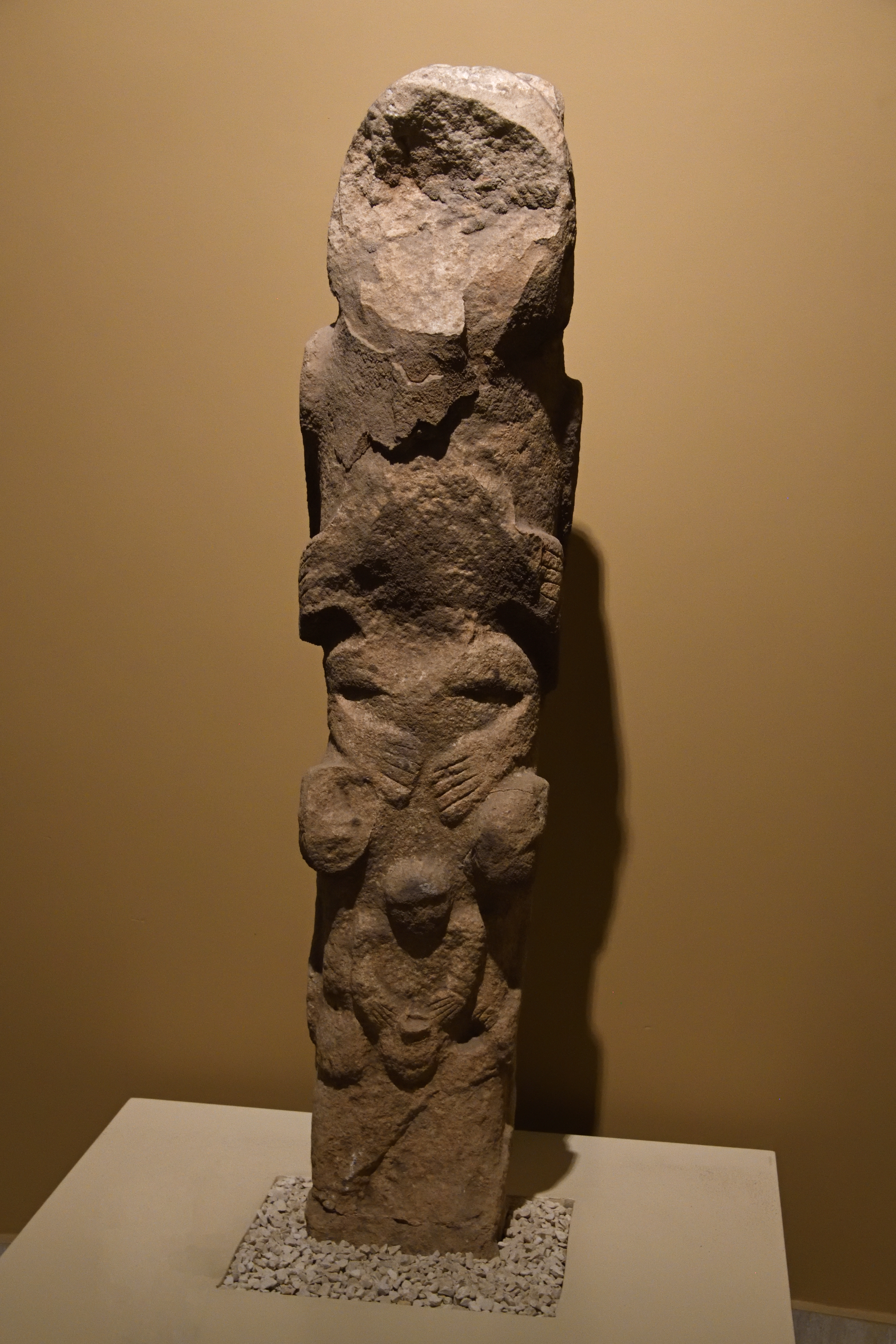
Sculptured totem with human figures

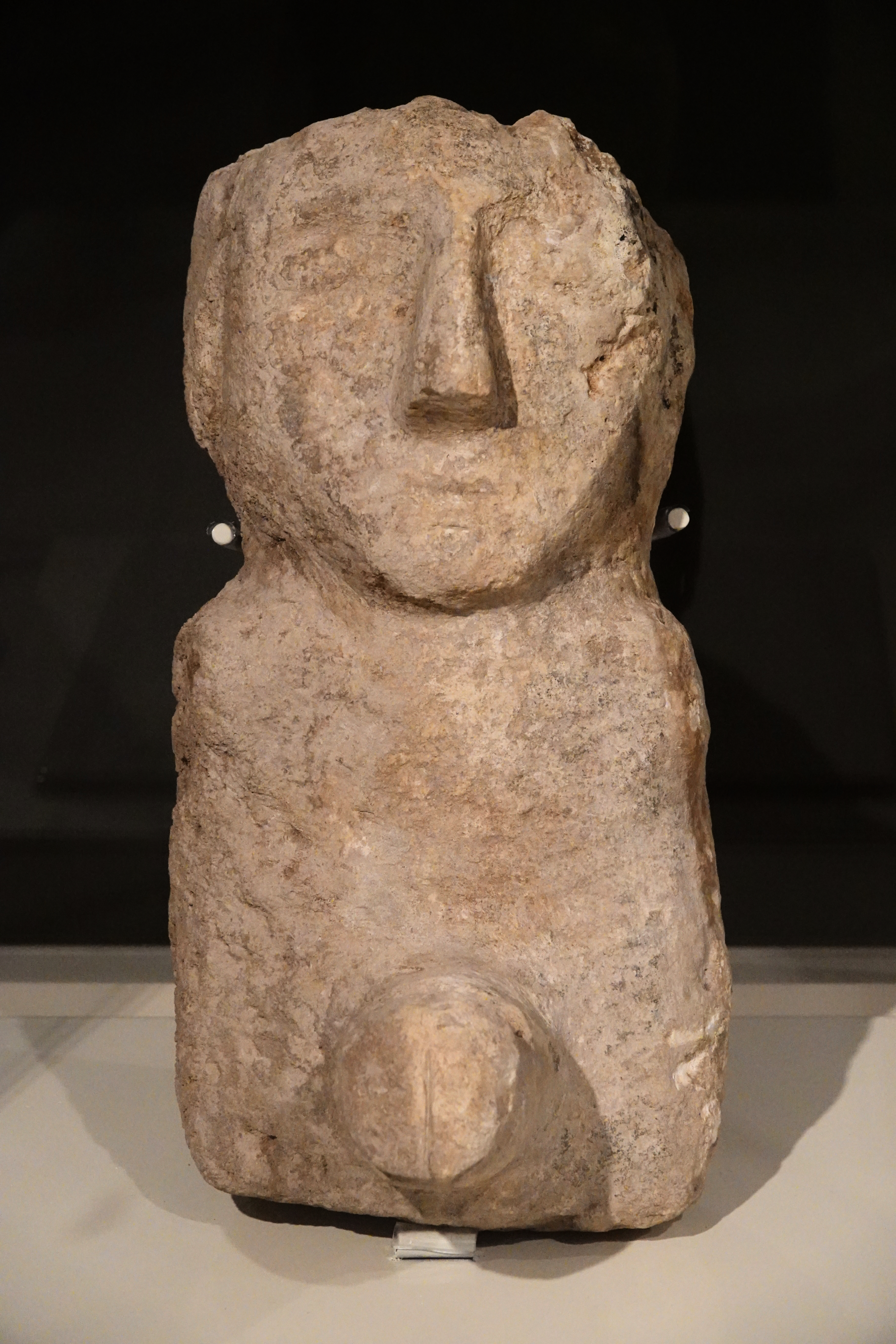
Statuette of a man with erect penis

One of the structures contained a "totem pole" dating to the early PPNB. Reassembled, it is 192 centimetres (6.30 ft) tall and 30 centimetres (0.98 ft) in diameter. It depicts three figures (from top to bottom): a predator (a bear or large felid) with a missing head and the neck and arms of a human; another figure missing a head with human arms, likely male; and a third figure with a head that survived intact. Snakes are carved on either side.

== Interpretation ==
Klaus Schmidt thought that Göbekli Tepe was a ritual center. As the initial leader of excavation in 1995, he suggested it was a central location for small, pre-pottery neolithic hunter-gatherer nomadic bands from across the region who joined forces on the hilltop for periodic building projects, hold great feasts and then scatter again.

Butchered bones found in large numbers from the local game such as deer, gazelle, pigs, and geese have been identified as refuse from food hunted and cooked or otherwise prepared for the congregants. Zooarchaeological analysis shows that gazelle were only seasonally present in the region, suggesting that events such as rituals and feasts were likely timed to occur during periods when game availability was at its peak. Schmidt saw the construction of Göbekli Tepe as contributing to the later development of urban civilization.

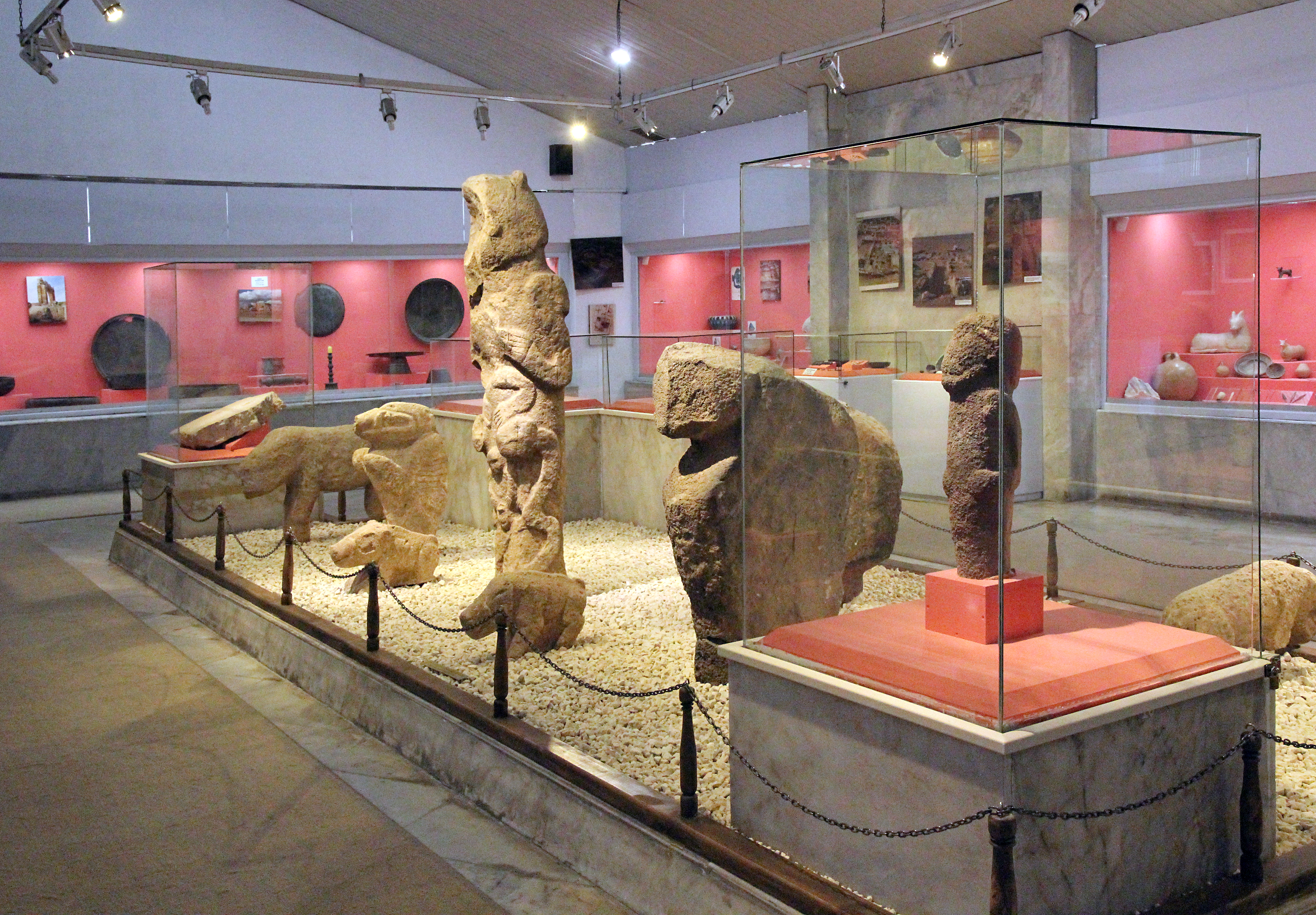
Steles and sculptures from Göbekli Tepe in Şanlıurfa Museum

Schmidt also speculated about the belief systems of said nomadic bands that created Göbekli Tepe based on comparisons with other shrines and settlements. He presumed shamanic practices. He suggested that the T-shaped pillars represent human forms, perhaps ancestors. In contrast, he saw a fully articulated belief in deities as not developing until later, in Mesopotamia, that was associated with extensive temples and palaces. This corresponds well with an ancient Sumerian belief that agriculture, animal husbandry, and weaving were brought to humans from the sacred mountain Ekur, which was inhabited by Annuna deities, very ancient deities without individual names. Schmidt identified this story as a primeval oriental myth that preserves a partial memory of the emerging Neolithic. It is apparent that the animal and other images do not indicate organised violence, i.e., there are no depictions of hunting raids or wounded animals, and the pillar carvings generally ignore game on which the society depended, such as deer, in favour of formidable creatures such as lions, snakes, spiders, and scorpions. Expanding on Schmidt's interpretation that round enclosures could represent sanctuaries, Gheorghiu's semiotic interpretation reads the Göbekli Tepe iconography as a cosmogonic map that would have related the local community to the surrounding landscape and the cosmos.

The assumption that the site was strictly cultic in purpose and not inhabited has been challenged since Schmidt's death in 2014, as well by the suggestion that the structures served as large communal houses, "similar in some ways to the large plank houses of the Northwest Coast of North America with their impressive house posts and totem poles." It is unknown why the existing pillars were buried every few decades to be replaced by new stones as part of a smaller, concentric ring inside the older one. According to Rémi Hadad, in recent years, "the interpretative enthusiasm that sought to see Göbekli Tepe as a regional ceremonial centre where nomadic populations would periodically converge is giving way to a vision that is more in line with what is known about other large Pre-Pottery Neolithic sites, where ritual and profane functions coexist." For example, the discovery of domestic buildings and rainwater harvesting systems has forced a revision of the 'temple' narrative.

Claims have been made that it was an ancient astronomical observatory, but these have been largely rejected by the team working at the site.

== Research history ==
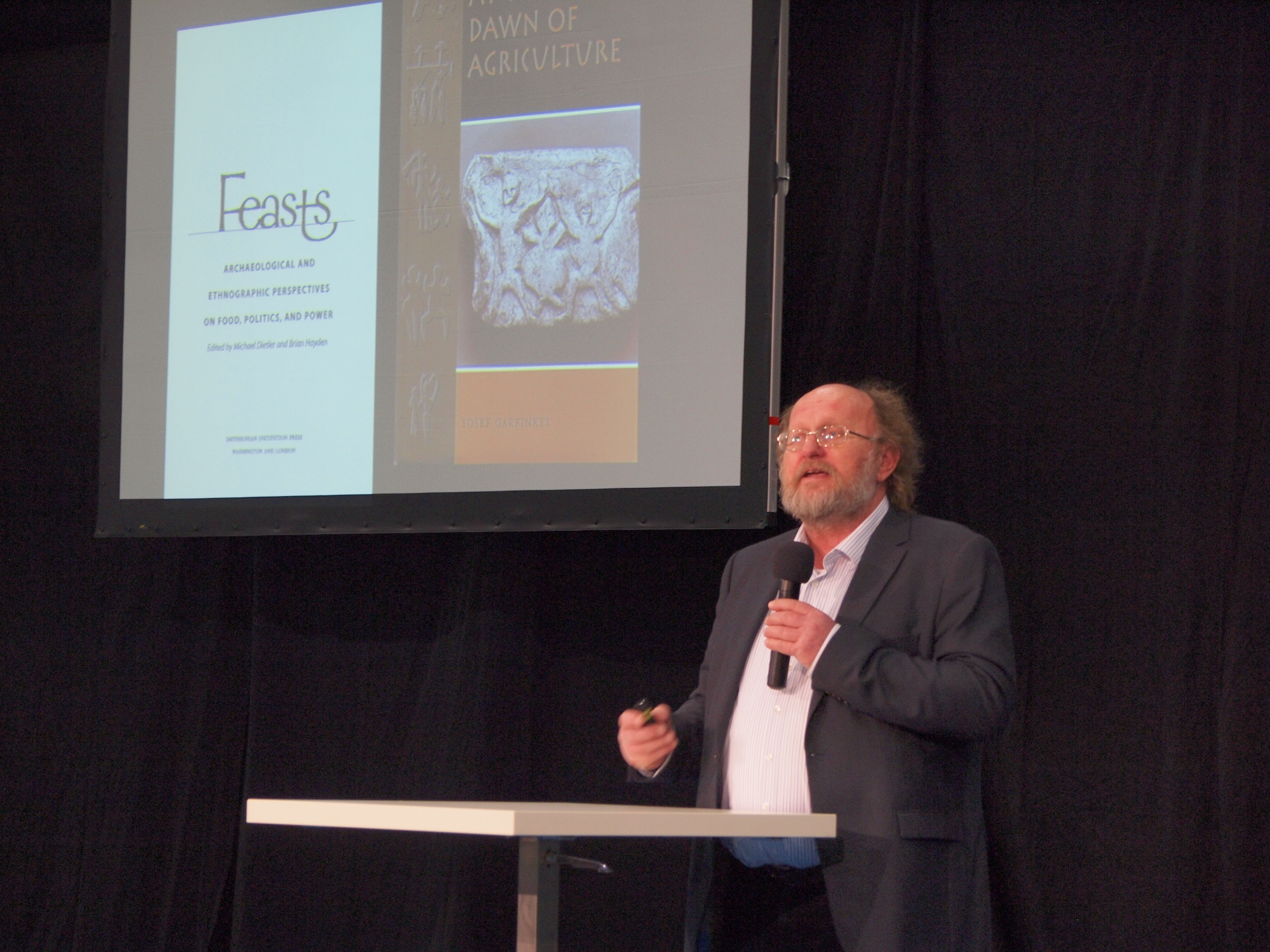
Klaus Schmidt delivering a lecture in Salzburg, 2014

Before being documented by archaeologists, the hill Göbekli Tepe stands on, known locally in Kurdish as Girê Mirazan or Xerabreşkê (Girê Mirazan meaning 'Wish Hill'), was considered a sacred place.

The archaeological site was first noted in 1963 as part of an archaeological survey directed by Halet Çambel of Istanbul University and Robert John Braidwood of the University of Chicago. American archaeologist Peter Benedict identified the stone tools collected from the surface of the site as characteristic of the Aceramic Neolithic, but mistook the upper parts of the T-shaped pillars for grave markers. The hill had long been under agricultural cultivation, and generations of local inhabitants had frequently moved rocks and placed them in clearance piles, which may have disturbed the upper layers of the site. At some point, attempts had been made to break up some of the pillars, presumably by farmers who mistook them for ordinary large rocks.

In October 1994, German archaeologist Klaus Schmidt, who had previously been working at Nevalı Çori, was looking for evidence of similar sites in the area and decided to re-examine the location described by the Chicago researchers in 1963. Asking in nearby villages about hills with flint, he was guided to Göbekli Tepe by Mahmut Yıldız, whose family owned the land the site was on. The Yıldız family had previously discovered finds while ploughing there, which they reported to the local museum. Having found similar structures at Nevalı Çori, Schmidt recognised the possibility that the stone slabs were not grave markers as supposed by Benedict, but the tops of prehistoric megaliths. He began excavations the following year and soon unearthed the first of the enormous T-shaped pillars. Ultimately, he found only three tombs on the eastmost hill group, a pilgrimage destination. Yıldız went on to work on the excavations and serve as the site's guard.

Schmidt continued to direct excavations at the site on behalf of the Şanlıurfa Museum and the German Archaeological Institute (DAI) until he died in 2014. Since then, the DAI's research at the site has been coordinated by Lee Clare. As of 2021, work on the site is conducted jointly by Istanbul University, the Şanlıurfa Museum, and the DAI, under the overall direction of Necmi Karul. Recent excavations have been more limited than Schmidt's, focusing on detailed documentation and conservation of the areas already exposed.

== Conservation ==
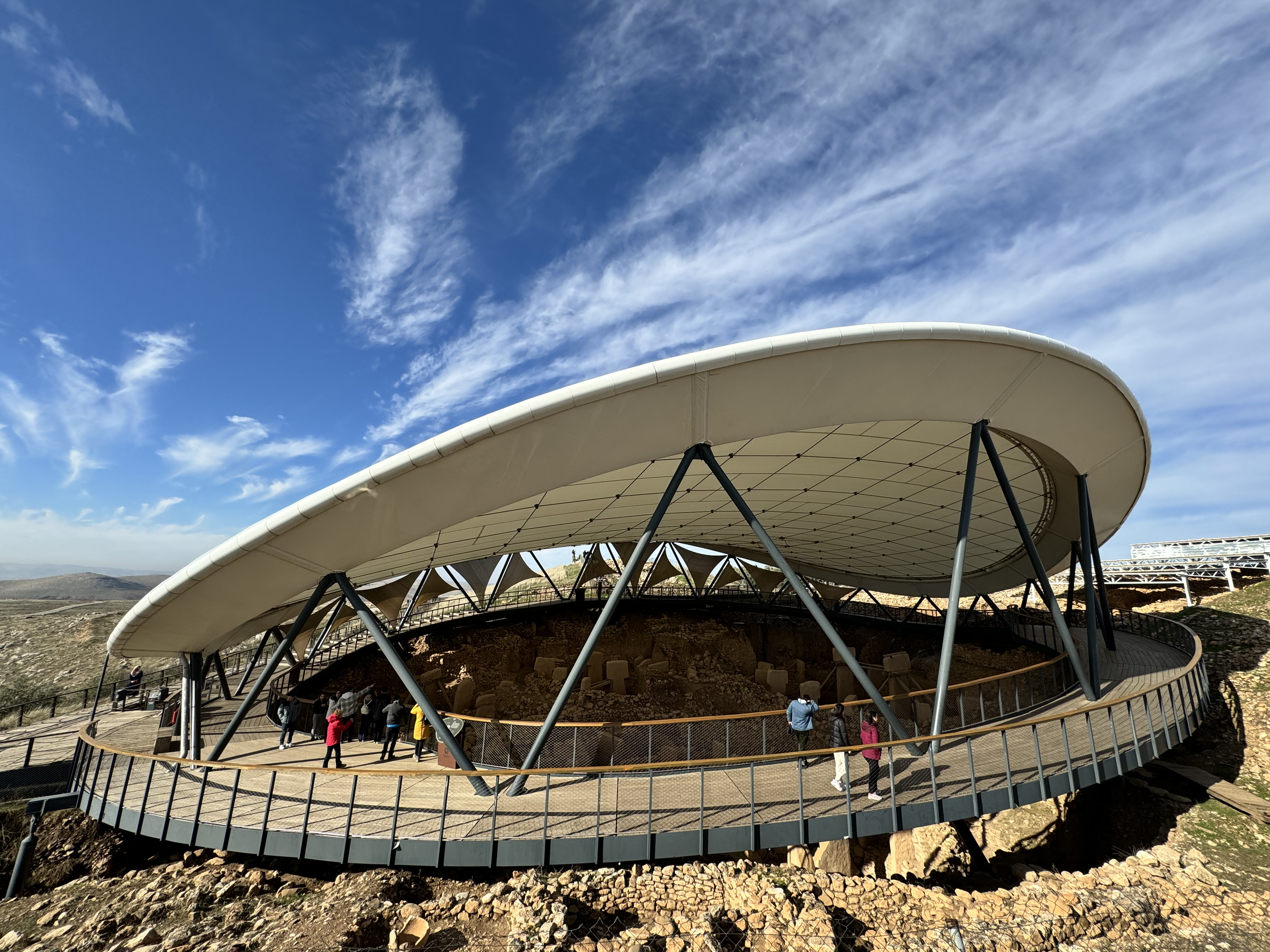
Protective roof added to the site

Göbekli Tepe was designated a UNESCO World Heritage Site in 2018, recognising its outstanding universal value as "one of the first manifestations of human-made monumental architecture". As of 2021, about 10% of the site has been excavated.

Conservation work at the site caused controversy in 2018 when Çiğdem Köksal Schmidt, an archaeologist and widow of Klaus Schmidt, said that damage was caused by using concrete and "heavy equipment" while constructing a new walkway. The Ministry of Culture and Tourism responded that no concrete was used and that no damage had occurred.

== See also ==
- Boncuklu Tarla – Neolithic archaeological site in Turkey
- Gürcütepe – Archaeological site in Turkey
- List of largest monoliths
- Prehistoric religion – Religion before written records
- Urfa Man – Neolithic Turkish statue

== Bibliography ==
- Altınışık, N. Ezgi; Kazancı, Duygu Deniz; Aydoğan, Ayça; Gemici, Hasan Can; Erdal, Ömür Dilek; Sarıaltun, Savaş; Vural, Kıvılcım Başak; Koptekin, Dilek; Gürün, Kanat; Sağlıcan, Ekin; Fernandes, Daniel; Çakan, Gökhan; Koruyucu, Meliha Melis; Lagerholm, Vendela Kempe; Karamurat, Cansu; Özkan, Mustafa; Kılınç, Gülşah Merve; Sevkar, Arda; Sürer, Elif; Götherström, Anders; Atakuman, Çiğdem; Erdal, Yılmaz Selim; Özer, Füsun; Erim Özdoğan, Aslı; Somel, Mehmet (4 November 2022). "A genomic snapshot of demographic and cultural dynamism in Upper Mesopotamia during the Neolithic Transition". Science Advances. 8 (44) eabo3609. Bibcode:2022SciA....8O3609A. doi:10.1126/sciadv.abo3609. ISSN 2375-2548. PMC 9635823. PMID 36332018.
- Arbuckle, Benjamin S. (2014). "Pace and process in the emergence of animal husbandry in Neolithic Southwest Asia" (PDF). Bioarchaeology of the Near East. 8: 53–81.
- Badisches Landesmuseum Karlsruhe, ed. (20 January – 17 June 2007). "Vor 12.000 Jahren in Anatolien. Die ältesten Monumente der Menschheit.". Begleitbuch zur Ausstellung im Badischen Landesmuseum. Stuttgart: Theiss. ISBN 978-3-8062-2072-8.
- Banning, Edward B. (2002). "Aceramic Neolithic". In Peregrine, Peter N.; Ember, Melvin (eds.). Encyclopedia of Prehistory, Volume 8: South and Southwest Asia. Kluwer Academic/Plenum Publishers. pp. 1–20. doi:10.1007/978-1-4615-0023-0_1. ISBN 978-1-4684-7135-9.
- Banning, Edward B. (2011). "So Fair a House: Göbekli Tepe and the Identification of Temples in the Pre-Pottery Neolithic of the Near East". Current Anthropology. 52 (5 – October 2011): 619–60. doi:10.1086/661207. S2CID 161719608.
- Batuman, Elif (11 December 2011). "Turkey's Ancient Sanctuary". The New Yorker.
- Beile-Bohn; Gerber; Morsch; Schmidt (1998). "Neolithische Forschungen in Obermesopotamien: Gürcütepe und Göbekli Tepe". Istanbuler Mitteilungen (in German). 48: 5–78.
- Benedict, Peter (1980). "Survey Work in Southeastern Anatolia". In Cambel, Halet; Braidwood, Robert J. (eds.). Prehistoric Research in Southeastern Anatolia. pp. 179, 181–182.
- Breuers, Jonas; Kinzel, Moritz (2022). ""[...] but it is not clear at all where all the [...] debris had been taken from [...]": Chipped Stone Artefacts, Architecture and Formation Processes at Göbekli Tepe". Tracking the Neolithic in the Near East. Lithic Perspectives on Its Origins, Development and Dispersals. pp. 469–486.
- Caletti, Christopher Claudio (8 November 2020). "Göbekli Tepe and the Sites around the Urfa Plain (SE Turkey): Recent Discoveries and New Interpretations". Asia Anteriore Antica. Journal of Ancient Near Eastern Cultures. 2: 95–123. doi:10.13128/ASIANA-679.
- Çelik, Bahattin (2010). "Hamzan Tepe in the light of new finds". Documenta Praehistorica. 37: 257–268. doi:10.4312/dp.37.22.
- Çelik, Bahattin (2011). "Karahan Tepe: A new cultural centre in the Urfa area in Turkey". Documenta Praehistorica. 38: 241–253. doi:10.4312/dp.38.19.
- Çelik, Bahattin (2016). "A small-scale cult centre in southeast Turkey: Harbetsuvan Tepesi". Documenta Praehistorica. 43: 421–428. doi:10.4312/dp.43.21.
- Clare, Lee; Pirson, Felix; Eichmann, Ricardo; Yüncü, Zeynep Tuna; İnan, Yıldırım; Mert, Duygu; Duzcu, Seda (2017). Göbekli Tepe: Nomination for Inclusion on the World Heritage List (Report). UNESCO.
- Clare, Lee (2020). "Göbekli Tepe, Turkey. A brief summary of research at a new World Heritage Site (2015–2019)". E-Forschungsberichte. 2020 (2). Deutsches Archäologisches Institut: 81–88. doi:10.34780/efb.v0i2.1012.
- Curry, Andrew (18 January 2008a). "Seeking the Roots of Ritual" (PDF). Science (319): 278–280. Archived from the original (PDF) on 15 April 2012.
- Curry, Andrew (2008b). "Göbekli Tepe: The World's First Temple?". Smithsonian. Vol. November 2008. ISSN 0037-7333.
- Curry, Andrew (2021). "Last Stand of the Hunter-Gatherers?". Archaeology. Vol. May/June 2021.
- Dietrich, Oliver; Schmidt, Klaus (2010). "A Radiocarbon Date from the Wall Plaster of Enclosure D of Göbekli Tepe" (PDF). Neo-Lithics. 2010 (2): 8.
- Dietrich, Oliver (2011). "Radiocarbon dating the first temples of mankind. Comments on 14C-Dates from Göbekli Tepe". Zeitschrift für Orient-Archäologie. 4: 12–25.
- Dietrich, Oliver; Köksal-Schmidt, Çiğdem; Notroff, Jens; Schmidt, Klaus (2013). "Establishing a Radiocarbon Sequence for Göbekli Tepe: State of Research and New Data" (PDF). Neo-Lithics. 2013 (1): 35–37.
- Dietrich, Laura; Meister, Julia; Dietrich, Oliver; Notroff, Jens; Kiep, Janika; Heeb, Julia; Beuger, André; Schütt, Brigitta (2019). "Cereal processing at Early Neolithic Göbekli Tepe, southeastern Turkey". PLOS ONE. 14 (5) e0215214. Bibcode:2019PLoSO..1415214D. doi:10.1371/journal.pone.0215214. ISSN 1932-6203. PMC 6493732. PMID 31042741.
- Dietrich, Oliver; Notroff, Jens (2015). "A sanctuary, or so fair a house? In defense of an archaeology of cult at Pre-Pottery Neolithic Gobekli Tepe". In Laneri, Nicola (ed.). Defining the Sacred: Approaches to the Archaeology of Religion in the Near East. Oxbow Books. p. 75. ISBN 978-1-78297-685-1.
- Dietrich, Oliver; Notroff, Jens; Schmidt, Klaus (2017). "Feasting, Social Complexity, and the Emergence of the Early Neolithic of Upper Mesopotamia: A View from Göbekli Tepe". Feast, Famine or Fighting? Multiple Pathways to Social Complexity. Springer International Publishing. pp. 91–132. doi:10.1007/978-3-319-48402-0_5. ISBN 978-3-319-48402-0.
- Dietrich, Oliver (8 May 2016a). "The current distribution of sites with T-shaped pillars". Tepe Telegrams.
- Dietrich, Oliver (22 June 2016b). "How old is it? Dating Göbekli Tepe". Tepe Telegrams.
- Dietrich, Oliver; Dietrich, Laura; Notroff, Jens (2017). "Cult as a Driving Force of Human History: A View from Göbekli Tepe". Expedition. Vol. 59, no. 3. Philadelphia, PA: Penn Museum.
- DVD-ROM: MediaCultura, ed. (2007). Vor 12.000 Jahren in Anatolien. Die ältesten Monumente der Menschheit. Stuttgart: Theiss. ISBN 978-3-8062-2090-2.
- Erbil, Ömer (21 March 2018). "Construction around site of Göbeklitepe stirs debate". Hürriyet Daily News.
- Flannery, Kent; Marcus, Joyce (2012). The Creation of Inequality. Cambridge MA: Harvard University Press. ISBN 978-0-674-06469-0.
- "Göbekli Tepe". Forvo Pronunciation Dictionary.
- Gheorghiu, Dragos (2015). "A river runs through it. The semiotics of Gobekli Tepe's map (an exercise of archaeological imagination)". In Vianello, Andrea (ed.). Rivers in Prehistory. Oxford: Archaeopress.
- Fuller, Dorian Q.; Willcox, George; Allaby, Robin G. (2012). "Early agricultural pathways: moving outside the 'core area' hypothesis in Southwest Asia". Journal of Experimental Botany. 63 (2): 617–633. doi:10.1093/jxb/err307. ISSN 0022-0957. PMID 22058404.
- Gresky, Julia; Haelm, Juliane; Clare, Lee (28 June 2017). "Modified human crania from Göbekli Tepe provide evidence for a new form of Neolithic skull cult". Science Advances. 3 (6) e1700564. Bibcode:2017SciA....3E0564G. doi:10.1126/sciadv.1700564. ISSN 2375-2548. PMC 5489262. PMID 28782013.
- Güler, Gül; Çelik, Bahattin; Güler, Mustafa (2013). "New Pre-Pottery Neolithic sites and cult centres in the Urfa Region". Documenta Praehistorica. 40: 291–303. doi:10.4312/dp.40.23.
- Güler, Mustafa; Çelik, Bahattin; Güler, Gül (2012). "New pre-pottery neolithic settlements from Viranşehir District". Anadolu / Anatolia. 38: 164–80. doi:10.1501/Andl_0000000398.
- "The guard of Göbeklitepe, humanity's 'ground zero'". Hürriyet Daily News. 27 March 2018.
- "Landowner recalls story of Göbeklitepe's discovery". Hürriyet Daily News. 5 March 2021.
- Lewis-Williams, David; Pearce, David (January 2006). "An Accidental revolution? Early Neolithic religion and economic change". Minerva. 17 #4 (July/August, 2006): 29–31.
- Linsmeier, Klaus-Dieter; Schmidt, Klaus (2003). "Ein anatolisches Stonehenge". Moderne Archäologie. Heidelberg: Spektrum-der-Wissenschaft-Verlag. pp. 10–15. ISBN 3-936278-35-0.
- Hadad, Rémi (2022). "In the shadow of monoliths: Göbekli Tepe and the monumental tradition of the Pre-Pottery Levant". In Laporte, Luc; Large, Jean-Marc; Nespoulous, Laurent; Scarre, Chris; Steimer-Herbet, Tara (eds.). Megaliths of the World. Oxford: Archaeopress. pp. 823–836. ISBN 978-1-80327-321-1.
- Haklay, Gil; Gopher, Avi (2020). "Geometry and Architectural Planning at Göbekli Tepe, Turkey". Cambridge Archaeological Journal. 30 (2): 343–357. doi:10.1017/S0959774319000660. ISSN 0959-7743.
- Hauptmann, Harald (1999). "The Urfa region". In Özdoğan, M.; Basgelen, N. (eds.). The Neolithic in Turkey: the cradle of civilization, new discoveries. Istanbul: Arkeoloji ve Sanat Yayınları. pp. 65–86.
- Herrmann, Richard A.; Schmidt, Klaus (2012). "Göbekli Tepe–Untersuchungen zur Gewinnung und Nutzung von Wasser im Bereich des steinzeitlichen Bergheiligtums". In Klimscha, F.; Eichmann, Ricardo; Schuler, C.; Fahlbusch, H. (eds.). Wasserwirtschaftliche Innovationen im archäologischen Kontext: von den prähistorischen Anfängen bis zu den Metropolen der Antike (in German). Rahden/Westfalen: Leidorf. pp. 54–67. ISBN 978-3-86757-385-6.
- Hodder, Ian (2018). "Things and the Slow Neolithic: the Middle Eastern Transformation". Journal of Archaeological Method and Theory. 25 (1): 155–177. doi:10.1007/s10816-017-9336-0. ISSN 1573-7764. S2CID 151467821.
- Kazanci, Handan (8 March 2020). "Turkey: Conservation, not excavation, focus in Gobeklitepe". Anadolu Agency.
- Kenyon, Kathleen (1965). Excavations at Jericho, II: The Tombs Excavated in 1955-1958. British School of Archaeology in Jerusalem.
- Kinzel, Moritz; Clare, Lee (2020). "Monumental – compared to what? A perspective from Göbekli Tepe". In Gebauer, Anne Birgitte; Sørensen, Lasse; Teather, Anne; Valera, António Carlos (eds.). Monumentalising Life in the Neolithic: Narratives of Change and Continuity. Oxford: Oxbow. pp. 29–48. ISBN 978-1-78925-495-2.
- Kinzel, Moritz; Clare, Lee; Sönmez, Devrim (2024). "Built on Rock–Towards a Reconstruction of the Neolithic Topography of Göbekli Tepe". Istanbuler Mitteilungen. 70: 9–45.
- Kosen, Hesen (24 July 2019). "Girê Mirozan Rihayê dike navenda geshtyariyê". Kurdistan 24 (in Kurdish).
- Knitter, Daniel; Braun, Ricarda; Clare, Lee; Nykamp, Moritz; Schütt, Brigitta (2019). "Göbekli Tepe: A Brief Description of the Environmental Development in the Surroundings of the UNESCO World Heritage Site". Land. 8 (4): 72. Bibcode:2019Land....8...72K. doi:10.3390/land8040072.
- Köksal-Schmidt, Çiğdem; Schmidt, Klaus (2010). "The Göbekli Tepe "Totem Pole": A First Discussion of an Autumn 2010 Discovery (PPN, Southeastern Turkey)" (PDF). Neo-Lithics. 2010 (1): 74–76.
- Kromer, Bernd; Schmidt, Klaus (1998). "Two Radiocarbon Dates from Göbekli Tepe, South Eastern Turkey" (PDF). Neo-Lithics. 1998 (3): 8.
- Lang, Caroline; Peters, Joris; Pöllath, Nadja; Schmidt, Klaus; Grupe, Gisela (2013). "Gazelle behaviour and human presence at early Neolithic Göbekli Tepe, south-east Anatolia". World Archaeology. 45 (3): 410–429. doi:10.1080/00438243.2013.820648. ISSN 0043-8243. S2CID 161637995.
- Lloyd, Seton; Brice, William (1951). "Harran". Anatolian Studies. 1: 77–111. doi:10.2307/3642359. ISSN 2048-0849. JSTOR 3642359. S2CID 240812354.
- Maher, Lisa A.; Richter, Tobias; Stock, Jay T. (2012). "The Pre-Natufian Epipaleolithic: Long-term Behavioral Trends in the Levant". Evolutionary Anthropology: Issues, News, and Reviews. 21 (2): 69–81. doi:10.1002/evan.21307. ISSN 1520-6505. PMID 22499441. S2CID 32252766.
- Mann, Charles C. (2011). "The Birth of Religion: The World's First Temple". National Geographic. Vol. 219, no. 6 – June 2011. Archived from the original on 20 August 2018.
- Meskell, Lynn (September 2008). "The nature of the beast: curating animals and ancestors at Çatalhöyük". World Archaeology. 40 (3): 373–389. doi:10.1080/00438240802261416. ISSN 0043-8243. S2CID 26968373.
- Mithen, Steven (2004). After the Ice: A global human history, 20,000–5000 BC. Cambridge MA: Harvard University Press. ISBN 0-674-01570-3.
- Moetz, Fevzi Kemal; Çelik, Bahattin (2012). "T-shaped pillar sites in the landscape around Urfa". In Matthews, Roger; Curtis, John (eds.). Proceedings of the 7th International Congress on the Archaeology of the Ancient Near East. Wiesbaden: Harrassowitz. ISBN 978-3-447-06684-6.
- Morez Jacobs, Adeline; Irish, Joel D.; Cooke, Ashley; Anastasiadou, Kyriaki; Barrington, Christopher; Gilardet, Alexandre; Kelly, Monica; Silva, Marina; Speidel, Leo; Tait, Frankie; Williams, Mia; Brucato, Nicolas; Ricaut, Francois-Xavier; Wilkinson, Caroline; Madgwick, Richard; Holt, Emily; Nederbragt, Alexandra J.; Inglis, Edward; Hajdinjak, Mateja; Skoglund, Pontus; Girdland-Flink, Linus (2 July 2025). "Whole-genome ancestry of an Old Kingdom Egyptian". Nature. 644 (8077): 714–721. doi:10.1038/s41586-025-09195-5. ISSN 1476-4687. PMC 12367555. PMID 40604286.
- Neef, Reinder (2003). "Overlooking the Steppe-Forest: A Preliminary Report on the Botanical Remains from Early Neolithic Göbekli Tepe (Southeastern Turkey)" (PDF). Neo-Lithics. 2002 (3): 13–16.
- Özkaya, Vecihi; Coşkun, Aytaç (2010). "Körtik Tepe, a new Pre-Pottery Neolithic A site in south-eastern Anatolia". Antiquity. 83 (320).
- Peters, Joris; Schmidt, Klaus (2004). "Animals in the symbolic world of Pre-Pottery Neolithic Göbekli Tepe, south-eastern Turkey: a preliminary assessment". Anthropozoologica. 39 (1).
- Peters, Joris; Buitenhuis, Hijlke; Grupe, Gisela; Schmidt, Klaus; Pöllath, Nadja (2013). "The Long and Winding Road: Ungulate Exploitation and Domestication in Early Neolithic Anatolia (10000–7000 cal BC)". In Colledge, Sue; Conolly, James; Dobney, Keith; Manning, Katie; Shennan, Stephen (eds.). The Origins and Spread of Domestic Animals in Southwest Asia and Europe. London: Routledge. doi:10.4324/9781315417653. ISBN 978-1-315-41765-3.
- Peters, Joris; Schmidt, Klaus; Dietrich, Laura; Dietrich, Oliver; Pöllath, Nadja; Kinzel, Moritz; Clare, Lee (2020). "Göbekli Tepe: Agriculture and Domestication". In Smith, Claudia (ed.). Encyclopedia of Global Archaeology. New York: Springer. pp. 4607–16. doi:10.1007/978-1-4419-0465-2_2226. ISBN 978-1-4419-0426-3.
- Pustovoytov, Konstantin (2002). "14C Dating of Pedogenic Carbonate Coatings on Wall Stones at Göbekli Tepe (Southeastern Turkey)" (PDF). Neo-Lithics. 2002 (2): 3–4.
- Qasim, Erika (2014). "The T-shaped monuments of Gobekli Tepe: Posture of the Arms". In Sütterlin, Christa; Schiefenhövel, Wulf; Lehmann, Christian; Forster, Johanna; Apfelauer, Gerhard (eds.). Art as Behaviour: An Ethological Approach to Visual and Verbal Art, Music and Architecture. Oldenburg: BIS-Verlag der Carl von Ossietzky Universität. pp. 252–272. ISBN 978-3-8142-2290-5.
- Richter, Tobias; Darabi, Hojjat (30 November 2023). The Epipalaeolithic and Neolithic in the Eastern Fertile Crescent: Revisiting the Hilly Flanks. Taylor & Francis. pp. 132ff. ISBN 978-1-000-81334-0.
- Richter, Tobias; Darabi, Hojjat; Alibaigi, Sajjad; Arranz-Otaegui, Amaia; Bangsgaard, Pernille; Khosravi, Shokouh; Maher, Lisa; Mortensen, Peder; Pedersen, Patrick; Roe, Joe; Yeomans, Lisa (February 2021). "The Formation of Early Neolithic Communities in the Central Zagros: an 11,500 year-old communal structure at Asiab". Oxford Journal of Archaeology. 40 (1): 2–22. doi:10.1111/ojoa.12213. S2CID 234033394.
- Şahin, Fatma; Massa, Michele (February 2025). "Mass-hunting in South-west Asia at the dawn of sedentism: new evidence from Şanlıurfa, south-east Türkiye". Antiquity. 99 (403). Cambridge University Press: Introduction. doi:10.15184/aqy.2024.155.
- Scham, Sandra (2008). "The World's First Temple". Archaeology. 61 (6 – November/December 2008). Archived from the original on 29 March 2012.
- Schmidt, Klaus (1998). "Frühneolithische Tempel. Ein Forschungsbericht zum präkeramischen Neolithikum Obermesopotamiens". Mitteilungen der deutschen Orient-Gesellschaft (130). Berlin: 17–49. ISSN 0342-118X.
- Schmidt, Klaus (1999). "Boars, Ducks, and Foxes – the Urfa-Project 99" (PDF). Neo-Lithics. 1999 (3): 12–15.
- Schmidt, Klaus (2000). "Zuerst kam der Tempel, dann die Stadt." Vorläufiger Bericht zu den Grabungen am Göbekli Tepe und am Gürcütepe 1995–1999". Istanbuler Mitteilungen (50): 5–41.
- Schmidt, Klaus (2000a). "Göbekli Tepe and the rock art of the Near East". Tüba-Ar (3): 1–14. doi:10.22520/tubaar.2000.0001 (inactive 12 July 2025).
- Schmidt, Klaus (2000b). "Göbekli Tepe, Southeastern Turkey. A preliminary Report on the 1995–1999 Excavations". Paléorient. 26 (1). Paris: 45–54. doi:10.3406/paleo.2000.4697. ISSN 0153-9345.
- Schmidt, Klaus (2006). Sie bauten die ersten Tempel. Das rätselhafte Heiligtum der Steinzeitjäger (in German). München: C.H. Beck. ISBN 3-406-53500-3.
- Schmidt, Klaus (2009). "Göbekli Tepe. Eine Beschreibung der wichtigsten Befunde erstellt nach den Arbeiten der Grabungsteams der Jahre 1995–2007". In Schmidt, Klaus (ed.). Erste Tempel – Frühe Siedlungen. 12000 Jahre Kunst und Kultur, Ausgrabungen und Forschungen zwischen Donau und Euphrat (in German). Oldenburg: Florian Isensee. ISBN 978-3-89995-563-7.
- Schmidt, Klaus (2010). "Göbekli Tepe – the Stone Age Sanctuaries: New results of ongoing excavations with a special focus on sculptures and high reliefs" (PDF). Documenta Praehistorica. 37 (XXXVII): 239–56. doi:10.4312/dp.37.21. Archived from the original (PDF) on 31 January 2012.
- Schmidt, Klaus (2011). "Göbekli Tepe: A Neolithic Site in Southwestern Anatolia". In Steadman, Sharon R.; McMahon, Gregory (eds.). The Oxford Handbook of Ancient Anatolia: (10,000-323 BCE). Oxford University Press. ISBN 978-0-19-537614-2.
- Schmidt, Klaus (2012). "Anatolia". In Potts, Daniel (ed.). A Companion to the Archaeology of the Ancient Near East. Oxford: Blackwell. pp. 144–160.
- Schmidt, Klaus (2015). Le premier temple: Göbekli Tepe (in French). Translated by Guiot-Houdart, Thérèse. Paris: CNRS éditions. ISBN 978-2-271-08160-5.
- Schönicke, Julia (2019). "There and Back Again — Towards a New Understanding of Abandonment Practices at the Neolithic Settlement of Göbekli Tepe". Bridging the Gap: Disciplines, Times, and Spaces in Dialogue. Vol. 1. pp. 210–237.
- Stordeur, Danielle (2003). "Des crânes surmodelés à Tell Aswad de Damascène (PPNB - Syrie)". Paléorient (in French). 29 (2): 109–115. doi:10.3406/paleo.2003.4767. ISSN 0153-9345.
- Symmes, Patrick (18 February 2010). "Turkey: Archeological Dig Reshaping Human History". Newsweek.
- "Our Project". Tepe Telegrams.
- "Göbekli Tepe". UNESCO World Heritage Centre.
- Yeşilyurt, Metin (2014). "Die wissenschaftliche Interpretation von Göbeklitepe: Die Theorie und das Forschungsprogramm". Neolithikum und ältere Metallzeiten. Studien und Materialien. Vol. 2. Berlin: Lit Verlag. ISBN 978-3-643-12528-6.
- Watkins, Trevor (2010). "New light on Neolithic revolution in south-west Asia". Antiquity. 84 (325): 621–634. doi:10.1017/S0003598X00100122. ISSN 0003-598X.
- Watkins, Trevor (14 August 2017). "From Pleistocene to Holocene: the prehistory of southwest Asia in evolutionary context". History and Philosophy of the Life Sciences. 39 (3) 22. doi:10.1007/s40656-017-0152-3. ISSN 1742-6316. PMC 5556129. PMID 28808914.
- Zeder, Melinda A.; Smith, Bruce D. (2009). "A Conversation on Agricultural Origins: Talking Past Each Other in a Crowded Room". Current Anthropology. 50 (5): 681–691. doi:10.1086/605553. ISSN 0011-3204. JSTOR 10.1086/605553. S2CID 41194691.
- Zekîoğlu, Jînda (2020). "Kêmasîya ku li Girê Mirazan derketîye holê bêdewletbûna kurdan e". Le Monde diplomatique kurdî (in Kurdish). No. 57. Archived from the original on 2 June 2021.
