= M'lefaat =

Archaeological site in Iraq

- Location within Iraq Location within Near East
- 36°18′N 43°33′E
- Type: archaeological site, tell
- Periods: Pre-Pottery Neolithic A
- Location: Nineveh Governorate, Iraq
- Region: Upper Mesopotamia

Site notes
- Elevation: 314 m (1,030 ft)
- Height: 3 m (9.8 ft)
- Diameter: 90 m (300 ft)
- Excavation dates: 1954; 1984; 1989; 1990
- Archaeologists: Robert John Braidwood, Matti Baba Altun, Stefan Kozłowski

M'lefaat is a tell, or archaeological settlement mound, in Upper Mesopotamia that was occupied during the Pre-Pottery Neolithic A.

== History of research ==
The site was first excavated by Robert Braidwood in 1954 as part of their larger project on uncovering the early prehistory of the hilly flanks. At that time, the site was already damaged by the construction of a military installation during World War II. In 1984, a rescue excavation was carried out by the Mosul Department of Antiquities under the direction of Matti Baba Altun, as the site was threatened by road construction. Two further excavation seasons were conducted in 1989 and 1990, this time directed by Stefan Karol Kozłowski. M'lefaat is part of a small cluster of early Neolithic sites that have been excavated in northern Iraq and that also includes Qermez Dere and Nemrik 9.

== The site and its environment ==
M'lefaat is located near the Khazir River in Upper Mesopotamia, in what is now northern Iraq, at an elevation of 314 m above sea level. It is a small tell, approximately 90 m in diameter and up to 2 m high. The environment of M'lefaat is heavily degraded and characterised as moist steppe. Potentially, the area could support a savanna-type vegetation characterised by pistachio. Oak woodland may have been closer to the site than it is today. Annual precipitation at M'lefaat is sufficient for winter cultivation without additional irrigation.

== History of occupation ==
M'lefaat was a 0.7 ha settlement dating to the Pre-Pottery Neolithic A. More specifically, it has been described as belonging to the Taurus-Zagros Round House Horizon.

== See also ==
- Ginnig
