= Klaus Schmidt (archaeologist) =

German archaeologist (1953-2014)

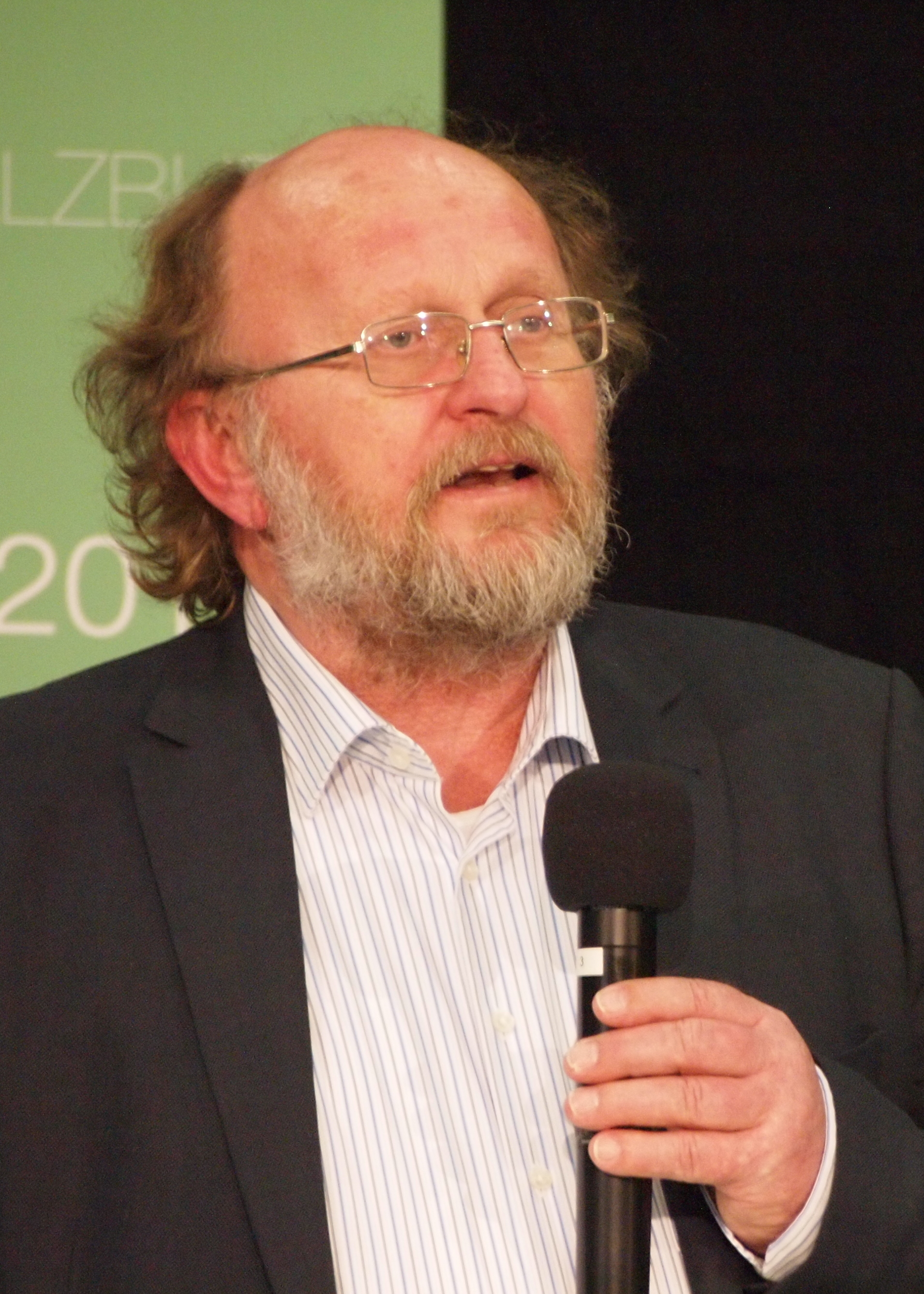
- Klaus Schmidt in 2014 at the Monumento Tradefair in Salzburg
- Born: 11 December 1953; Feuchtwangen, West Germany (now Germany)
- Died: 20 July 2014 (aged 60); Ückeritz, Germany
- Education: Heidelberg University; University of Erlangen-Nuremberg
- Known for: Göbekli Tepe
- Scientific career
- Fields: Archaeologist
- Workplaces: University of Erlangen-Nuremberg; German Archaeological Institute
- Doctoral advisor: Harald Hauptmann
- Website: https://www.uf.phil.fau.de/das-team/ehemalige-mitarbeiter/prof-dr-klaus-schmidt-%E2%80%A0/

Klaus Schmidt (11 December 1953 – 20 July 2014) was a German archaeologist and prehistorian who led the excavations at Göbekli Tepe from 1996 to 2014.

== Education and career ==
Klaus Schmidt studied pre- and protohistory, and classical archaeology and geology at the universities of Erlangen and Heidelberg. He completed his doctorate in 1983 at Heidelberg University under the direction of Harald Hauptmann. He received a travel stipend from the German Archaeological Institute from 1984 to 1986. From 1986 to 1995, he received a research stipend from the German Research Foundation. He was employed at the Institute of pre- and proto-history of the Heidelberg University, working on various projects with the German Archaeological Institute and the Heidelberg University.

In 1995, he became the leader of the excavations at Gürcütepe and Göbekli Tepe in Southeast Turkey. Schmidt purchased a house in nearby Urfa, which became his base of operations. His team of archaeologists typically excavated the site of Göbekli Tepe for two months in the spring and two months in the fall.

He received his habilitation in 1999 from the University of Erlangen and in 2000 became Privatdozent in Pre- and Proto-history at the Institute for Pre- and Proto-history of the University of Erlangen.

Starting in 2001, he became the referent in prehistoric archaeology of the Oriental division of the German Archaeological Institute, and from 2007 was a corresponding member of the institute. Also in 2007, he became an adjunct professor at the University of Erlangen.

== Personal life ==
Klaus Schmidt was married to Turkish archaeologist Çiğdem Köksal-Schmidt. She died of a heart attack while swimming in Germany on 20 July 2014.

== Works ==
- K. Schmidt, 2000b = Göbekli Tepe, Southeastern Turkey. A preliminary Report on the 1995–1999 Excavations. In: Paléorient CNRS Ed., Paris 2000: 26.1, 45–54, ISSN 0153-9345: http://www.persee.fr/web/revues/home/prescript/article/paleo_0153-9345_2000_num_26_1_4697
- K. Schmidt: "Zuerst kam der Tempel, dann die Stadt". Vorläufiger Bericht zu den Grabungen am Göbekli Tepe und am Gürcütepe 1995–1999. Istanbuler Mitteilungen 50 (2000): 5–41.
- K. Schmidt: Frühneolithische Tempel. Ein Forschungsbericht zum präkeramischen Neolithikum Obermesopotamiens. In: Mitteilungen der deutschen Orient-Gesellschaft 130, Berlin 1998, 17–49, ISSN 0342-118X
- K. Schmidt, 2000a = Göbekli Tepe and the rock art of the Near East, TÜBA-AR 3 (2000): 1–14.
- J. Peters & K. Schmidt: "Animals in the symbolic world of Pre-Pottery Neolithic Göbekli Tepe, south-eastern Turkey: a preliminary assessment." Anthropozoologica 39.1 (2004), 179–218: https://web.archive.org/web/20110612061638/http://www.mnhn.fr/museum/front/medias/publication/10613_Peters.pdf.
- K. Schmidt: Sie bauten die ersten Tempel. Das rätselhafte Heiligtum der Steinzeitjäger. Verlag C.H. Beck, München 2006, ISBN 3-406-53500-3.
- K. Schmidt, "Göbekli Tepe. Eine Beschreibung der wichtigsten Befunde erstellt nach den Arbeiten der Grabungsteams der Jahre 1995–2007", in K. Schmidt (ed.), Erste Tempel—Frühe Siedlungen. 12000 Jahre Kunst und Kultur, Ausgrabungen und Forschungen zwischen Donau und Euphrat, (Oldenburg 2009): 187–233.
- K. Schmidt, "Göbekli Tepe—the Stone Age Sanctuaries: New results of ongoing excavations with a special focus on sculptures and high reliefs," Documenta Praehistorica XXXVII (2010), 239–256: https://web.archive.org/web/20120131114925/http://arheologija.ff.uni-lj.si/documenta/authors37/37_21.pdf
