= Gürcütepe =

Archaeological site in Turkey

Gürcütepe is a Neolithic site on the southeastern outskirts of Şanlıurfa in Turkey, consisting of four very shallow tells along Sirrin Stream that flows from Şanlıurfa. All four hills are now covered by modern buildings, so they are no longer recognizable. In the late 1990s a German archaeological team under the direction of Klaus Schmidt carried out soundings on all four hills and made extensive excavations on the second hill seen from the east.

Originally it was assumed that the four hills were settled in a specific time sequence, that one of these settlement phases would coincide with the nearby Göbekli Tepe. However, the excavations have indicated that all four hills were settled during the Pre-Pottery Neolithic B period; the easternmost hill is from the later Pre-Pottery Neolithic C period.

Gürcütepe joins a group of Neolithic localities in Turkey, all rammed-earth buildings possessing space subdivisions next to larger community buildings. The small finds correspond to what archaeologists previously knew already. Overall, the Gürcütepe gives the impression of a rural settlement which was significantly younger than Göbekli Tepe.
