= Ginnig =

Archaeological site in Iraq

- Location within Iraq Location within Near East
- 36°43′04″N 42°16′27″E
- Type: tell
- Periods: Pre-Pottery Neolithic, Pottery Neolithic
- Location: Nineveh Governorate, Iraq
- Region: Upper Mesopotamia

Site notes
- Height: 0.5 metre
- Diameter: 100 metre
- Excavation dates: 1987–1988
- Archaeologists: Stuart Campbell

Ginnig is a tell (archaeological settlement mound) in Upper Mesopotamia (modern Nineveh Governorate, Iraq) that was occupied at the transition from the PPNB to the Pottery Neolithic.

== History of research ==
The site was discovered in 1986 during an archaeological field survey directed by Tony Wilkinson. It was excavated during a single season in 1987-1988 under the direction of Stuart Campbell, during which just over 80 m^{2} was excavated.

== The site and its environment ==
Ginnig is located in Nineveh Governorate (Iraq). The site measures some 80 by 100 m and extends ca. 50 cm above the surrounding plain. Excavation has shown that its depth is at least 2.2 m.

== History of occupation ==
A small excavation trench was dug down to virgin soil. Tauf walls were found in the deepest levels, but no pottery.

The excavation revealed an almost complete building in the top-most, most recent level at Ginnig, with scant evidence for several other buildings. The complete building was constructed of tauf walls and consisted of multiple small, irregular rooms . It is possible that the building was built agglutinatively by adding rooms one at a time. Some of the walls may not have extended up to the roof. Small doorways gave access to the rooms and these are parallelled at other contemporary sites such as Sotto and Yarim Tepe. Based on the artefacts that were recovered from the rooms, it has been suggested that each room may have been used for separate domestic activities. Animal bone and skull remains found at the bottom of the walls and in pits dug into the floors of the rooms have been interpreted as ritual deposits related to the "opening" and "closing" of the building. Small quantities of pottery were found in this level.

The lithic material from the site seems to indicate that Ginnig was occupied from the PPNB to the Pottery Neolithic. The lithics are similar to those recovered from nearby sites such as Qermez Dere and M'lefaat. The pottery from the latest level has been described as a "monotone prototype version of the now well-known proto-Hassuna assemblage". The site is important as it one of only a few in Upper Mesopotamia where early ceramic material was excavated in combination with earlier, aceramic material.
