= Trevor Watkins =

British archaeologist

Trevor Watkins is a British archaeologist and emeritus professor of Near Eastern prehistory at the University of Edinburgh. He has worked extensively on the Neolithic Revolution in Southwest Asia, including translating Jacques Cauvin's seminal work The Birth of the Gods and the Origins of Agriculture into English. He excavated the site of Qermez Dere in Iraq in the 1980s.

== Publications ==
=== Books ===
- Trevor Watkins (2023), Becoming Neolithic: The Pivot of Human History, Routledge, ISBN 978-0-415-22152-8
