= Qermez Dere =

Early Neolithic settlement in Iraq

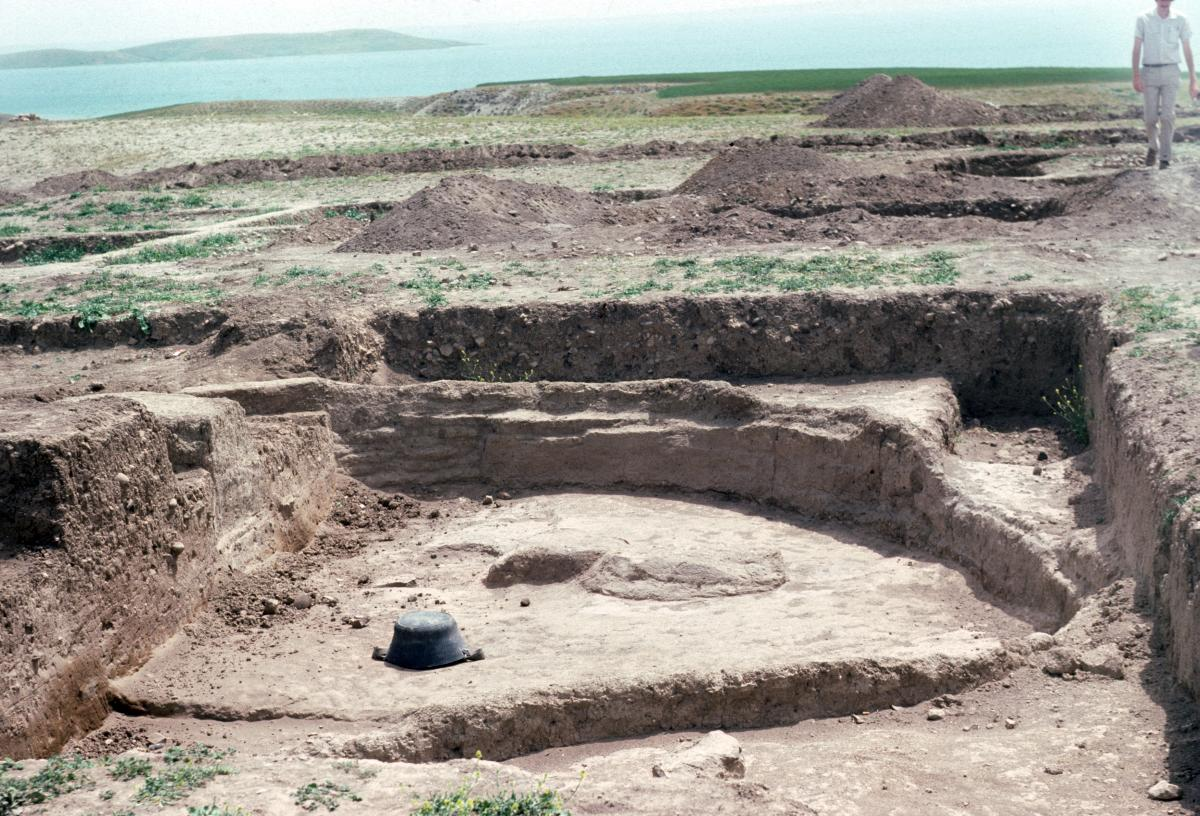

- Location within Iraq Location within Near East
- 36.3832730°N 42.4324928°E
- Type: Settlement
- Periods: Pre-Pottery Neolithic
- Location: Nineveh, Iraq

History
- Built: c. 8500 BC
- Abandoned: c. 7900 BC

Site notes
- Excavation dates: 1987, 1989-1990
- Archaeologists: Trevor Watkins
- Discovered: 1987

Qermez Dere was an early Neolithic settlement in the northwestern edges of Tal Afar in Nineveh, Iraq. This archaeological site was discovered in 1987 during a rescue operation. It covers an area of about 100 metres (330 ft) x 60 metres (200 ft) and forms a 2 metres (6.6 ft) tall tell. The buildings were made of primitive Mud bricks, which is not a perennial material, and are mostly destroyed. However, archaeologists have excavated a one-room structure in good shape. The room's corners are rounded, showing the care that went into its construction. Also, vestiges of non-structural clay columns have been found, suggesting primitive instances of furniture.

Radiocarbon dating has estimated that Qermez Dere was built between 8500 BC and 7900 BC.

== See also ==
- Ginnig
