= Taş Tepeler =

Mounds in southeastern Anatolia

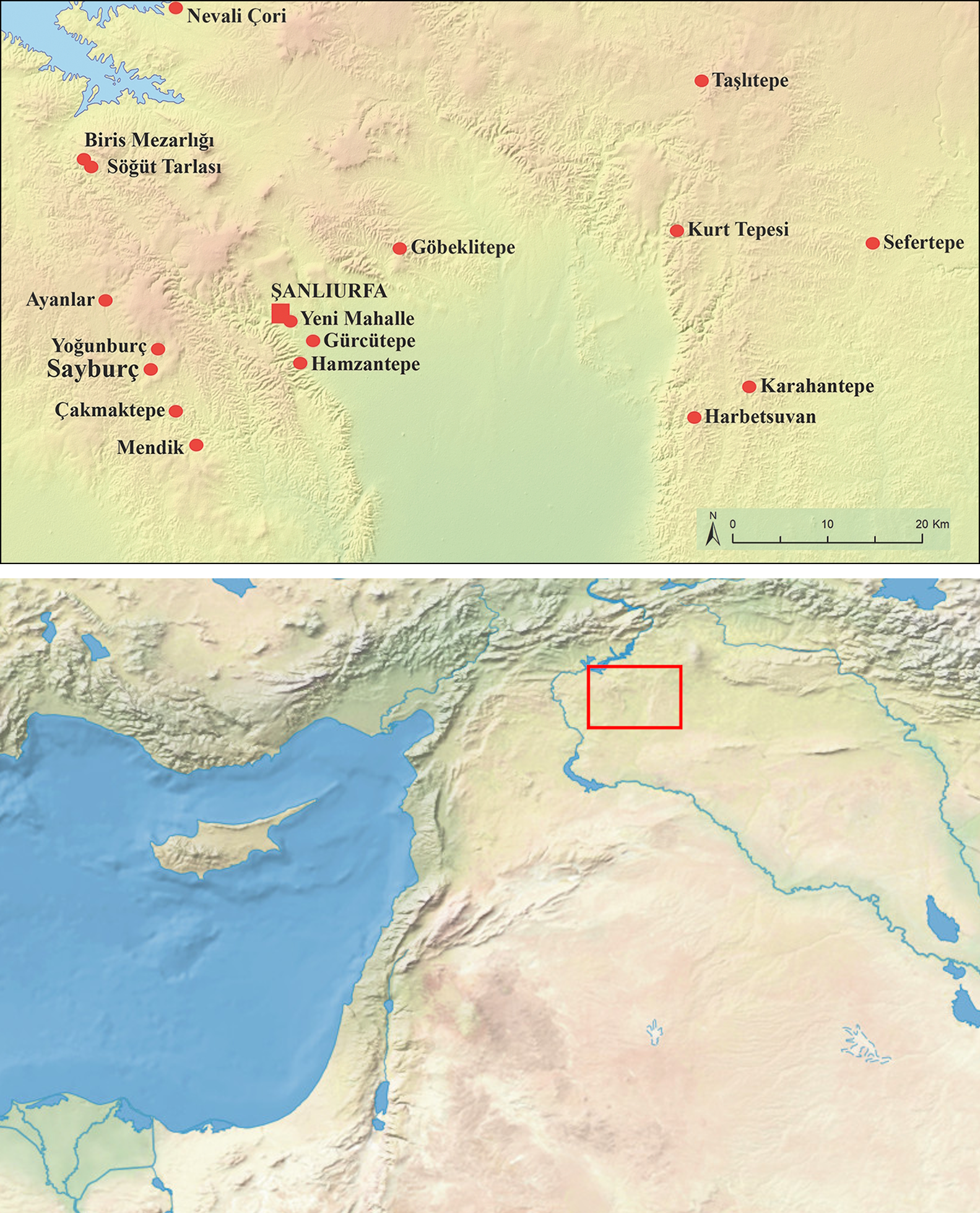
Locations of the main Taş Tepeler sites around Şanlıurfa

The Taş Tepeler (Turkish, literally 'Stone Mounds') are a group of Neolithic archaeological sites in Upper Mesopotamia (al-Jazira), near the city of Urfa in modern-day Turkey. They are the remains of an early civilisation dating to the Pre-Pottery Neolithic (PPN) period (c. 10,000–7000 BCE), during transition from nomadic hunter-gatherer societies to settled agricultural communities in the region.

== Economy and culture ==
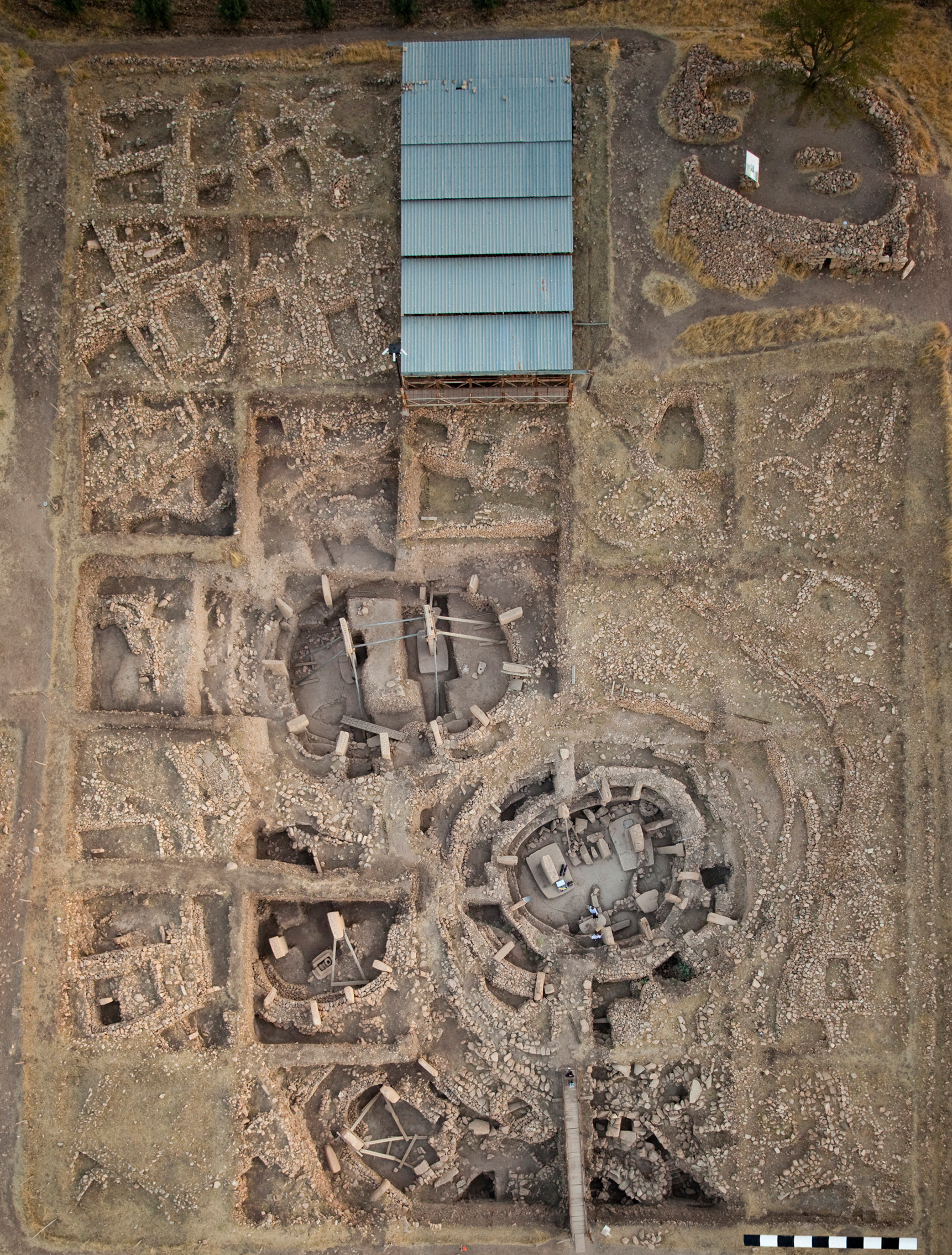
Aerial view of the main excavation area at Göbekli Tepe, 10th millennium BCE

The societies of Taş Tepeler still had not yet developed the herding of animals or well-developed agriculture: their subsistence depended on hunting and selective harvesting of wild cereal grasses, perhaps early forms of domesticated cereal.

Man's domestication of animals seems to have started within the broad region of the Taş Tepeler culture, and early efforts at animal management, especially symbolic representations and entrapment methods, seem to broadly coincide with the development of Göbekli Tepe, as shown in its animal art. The earliest dates for the actual domestication of animals are c. 9000 BCE for goats and sheep, c. 8500 BCE for pigs, and c. 8000 BCE for cattle, all in the area of Northern Mesopotamia. Çayönü Tepe for example may be where some of the first animal domestication occurred, as the pig may have first been domesticated there in 8,500 BCE.

Sites such as Çayönü Tepe developed from the cultural tradition of Gobekli Tepe, and started to implement agriculture from the 9th millennium BCE, as well as other sites such as Neva Çori or Cafer Höyük, Hallan Çemi, Abu Hureyra and Jerf al Amar.

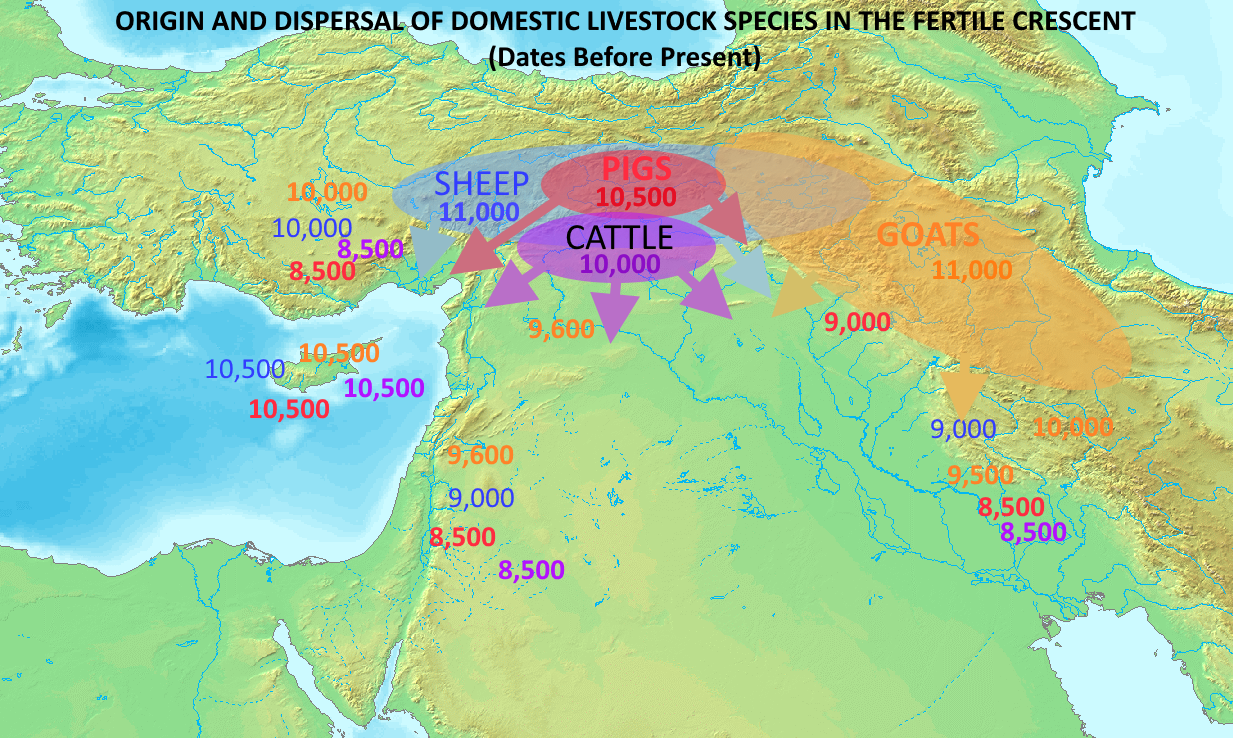
Origin and dispersal of domestic livestock species in the Fertile Crescent (dates Before Present).

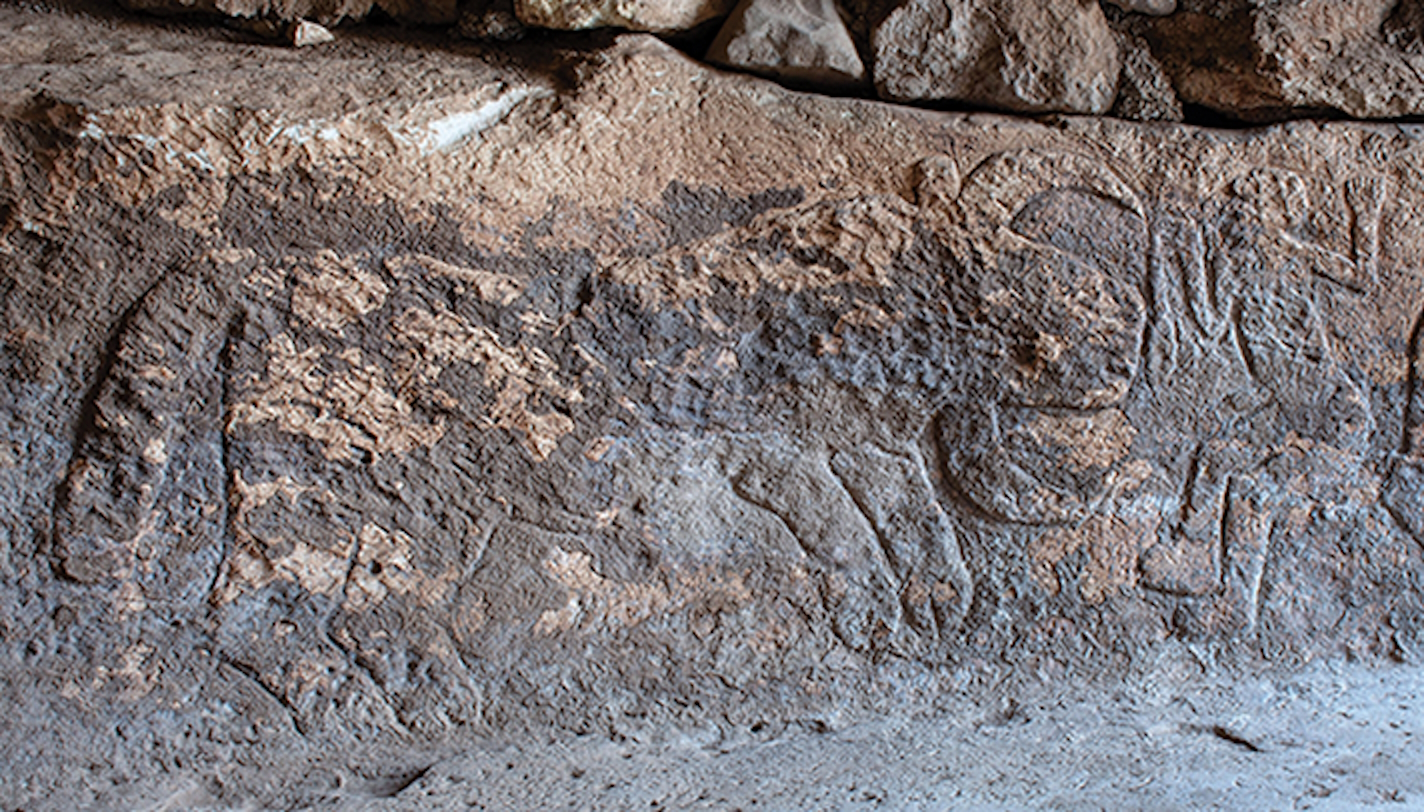
Man with aurochs, holding a contraption and likely controlling the animal. Sayburç, 9th millennium BCE.

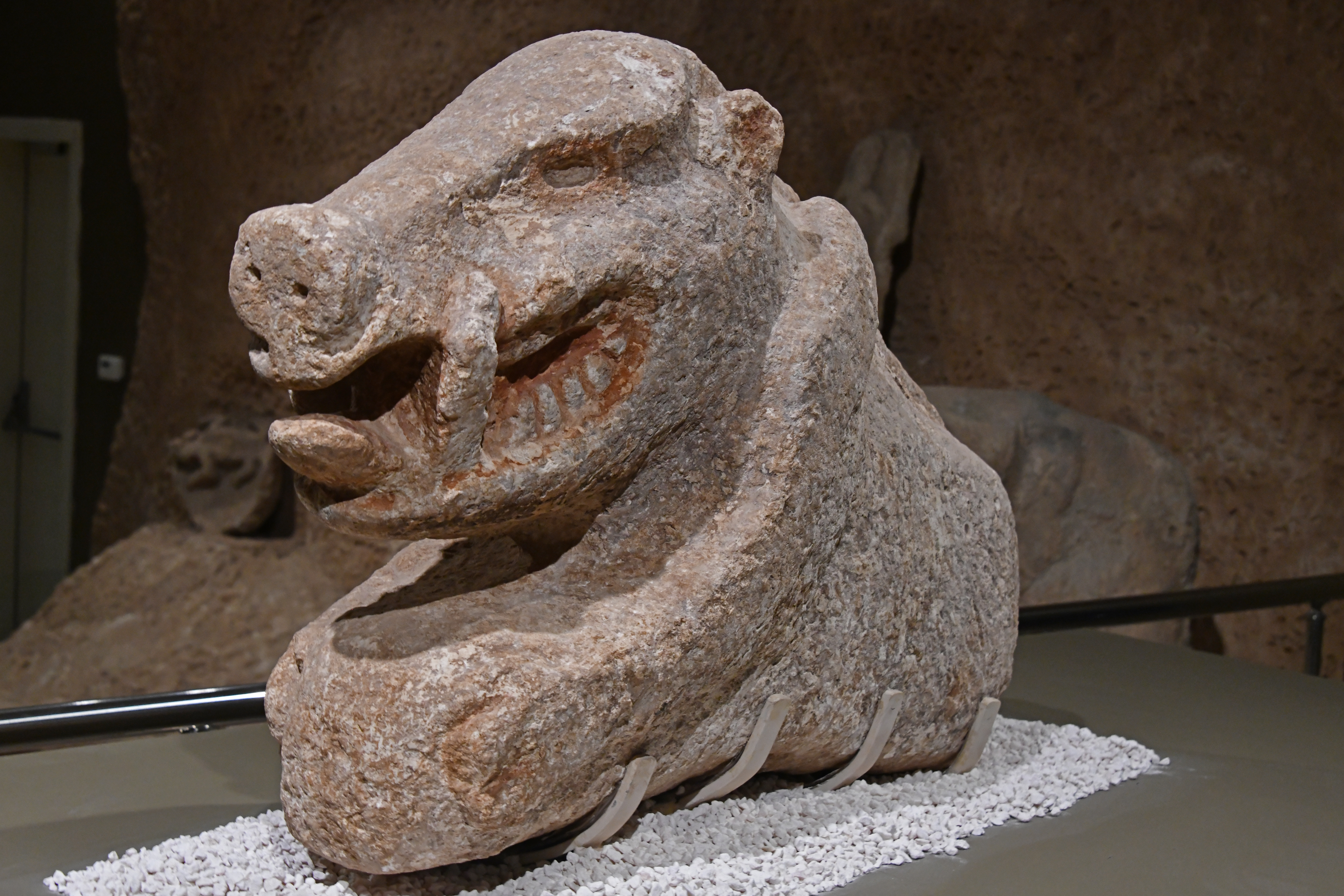
Painted boar from Göbekli Tepe, 8700-8200 BCE

== Religion ==
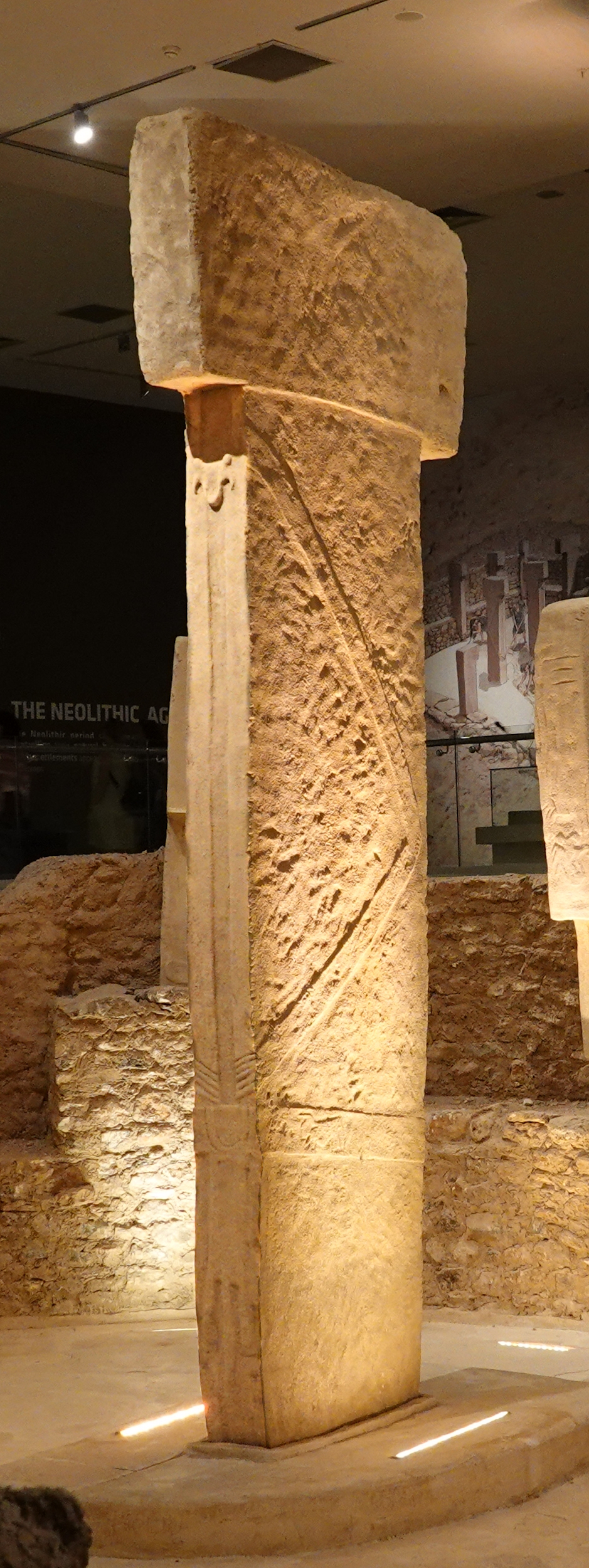
Reproduction of the central pillars of Enclosure D in Göbekli Tepe. Side-arms with terminal hands are engraved across the shaft, resting over a belt.

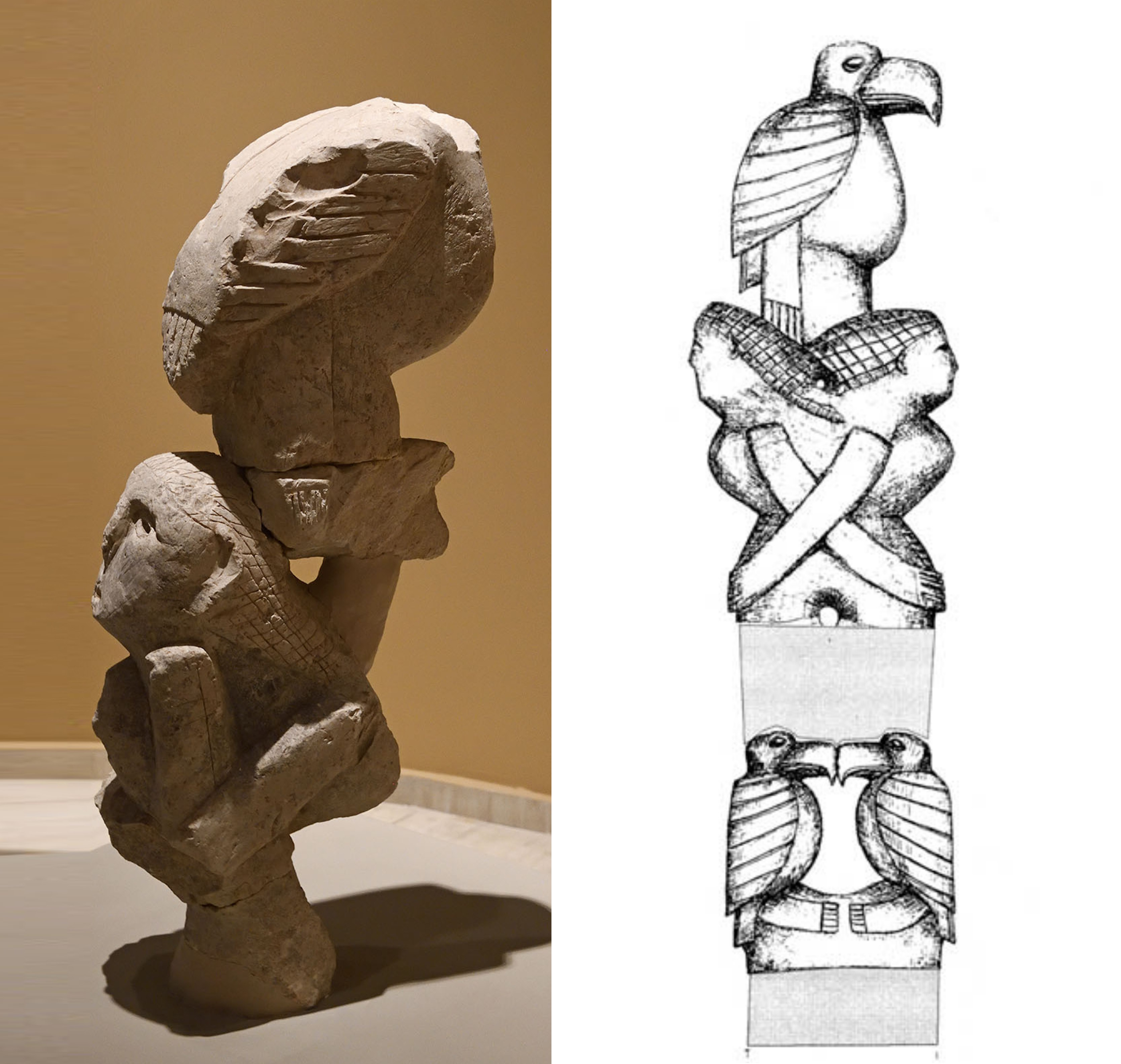
"Totem head", with tentative reconstruction. Nevalı Çori (8400-8100 BCE).

Many Taş Tepeler sites contain large stone buildings with the T-shaped obelisks characteristic of Göbekli Tepe. They are characterized by their monumentality, which sets them apart from earlier sedentary Pre-Pottery Neolithic archaeological sites such as Körtik Tepe, which is not included in the Taş Tepeler category.

These buildings may have been some of the earliest sanctuaries for ancestor cult. They were furnished with T-shaped stelae, such as those of Gobekli Tepe, Karahan Tepe, or the rectangular stelae of Çayönü Tepe. These stelae are thought to have been symbolic images of men or gods. Several stelae had anthropomorphic reliefs, or even human heads, carved on them. These findings suggest stela worship, a form of cult which was prevalent in the Pre-Pottery Neolithic B period, and remained widespread in the Near-East until the 1st millennium BCE.

=== T-shaped stelae ===
The T-shaped pillar tradition seen at Göbekli Tepe is unique to the Urfa region but is found at most PPN sites. These include Nevalı Çori, Hamzan Tepe, Karahan Tepe, Harbetsuvan Tepesi, Sefer Tepe, and Taslı Tepe. Other stone stelae—without the characteristic T shape—have been documented at contemporary sites further afield, including Çayönü, Qermez Dere, Boncuklu Tarla and Gusir Höyük.

On the stelae, geometrical side-arms ending with hands are often sculpted in low-relief, suggesting that these pillars represent stylized anthropomorphic beings, the top of the "T" corresponding to the head. Belts and human clothing are also often sculpted as well.

=== Totems ===
Totems combining humans and animals were found in Göbekli Tepe and in Nevalı Çori. The one in Nevalı Çori represent a bird, probably a vulture, standing on top of two human seated back-to-back. The meaning of such totems is as yet unknown.

=== Phallic symbolism ===
Phallic symbolism seems to be a prevalent characteristic of the art associated with the Taş Tepeler sites. Statues of men holding their erect penis can be seen from Yeni Mahalle (the famous Urfa Man statue), Göbekli Tepe, Harbetsuvan Tepesi, Karahan Tepe or Sayburç. It has even been argued that the stelae themselves may have been phallic representations of ancestors. The figures also generally have a V-shaped collar around the neck.

Phallic symbolism may also be part of the general forcefully realistic style of the sculptures, as seen for example in Gobekli Tepe, with animals being typically shown with bared teeth, powerful paws, or long tusks, contributing to the threatening atmosphere of the monuments.

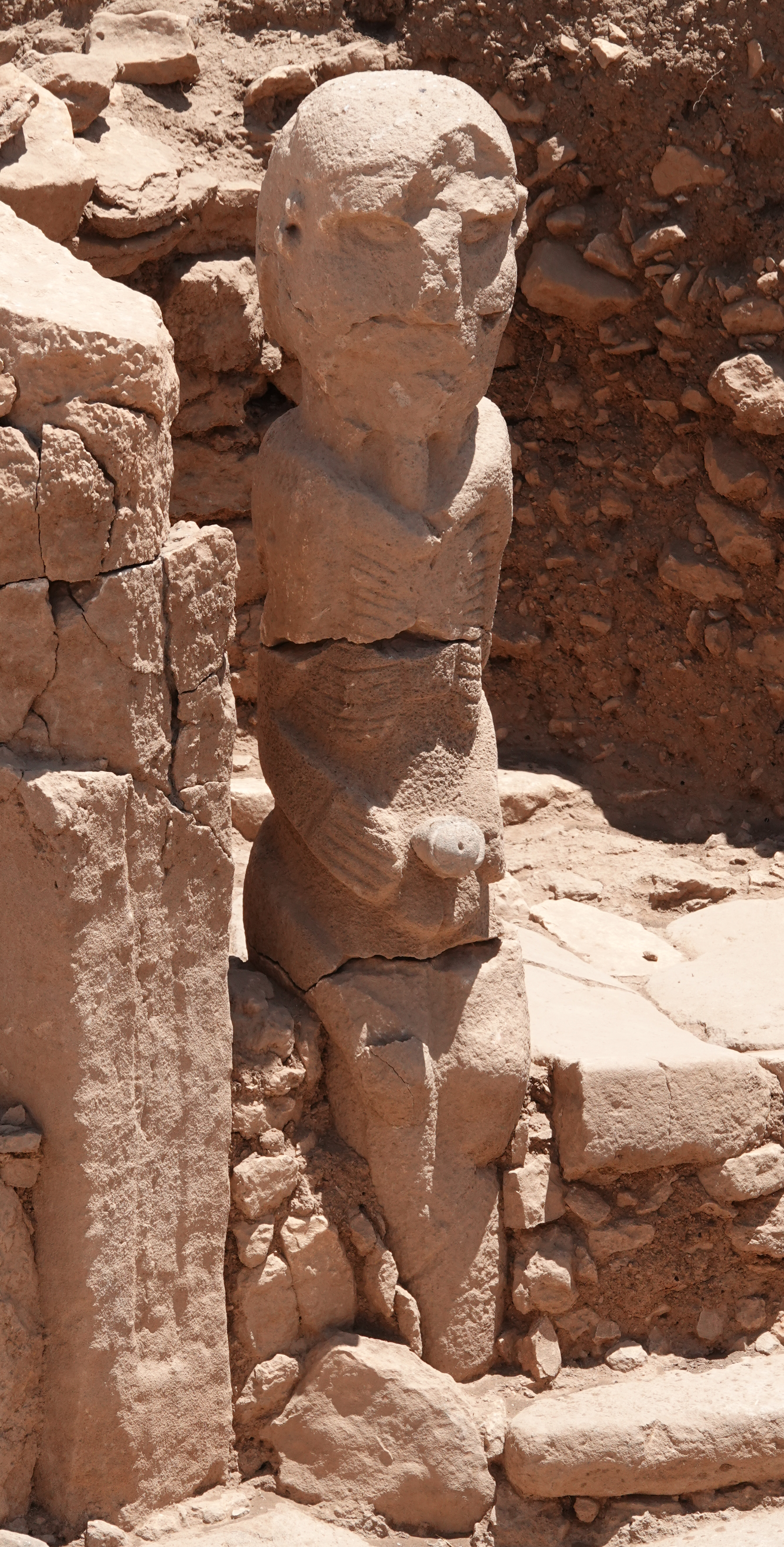
Karahan Tepe Man, 10,000-9,500 BCE

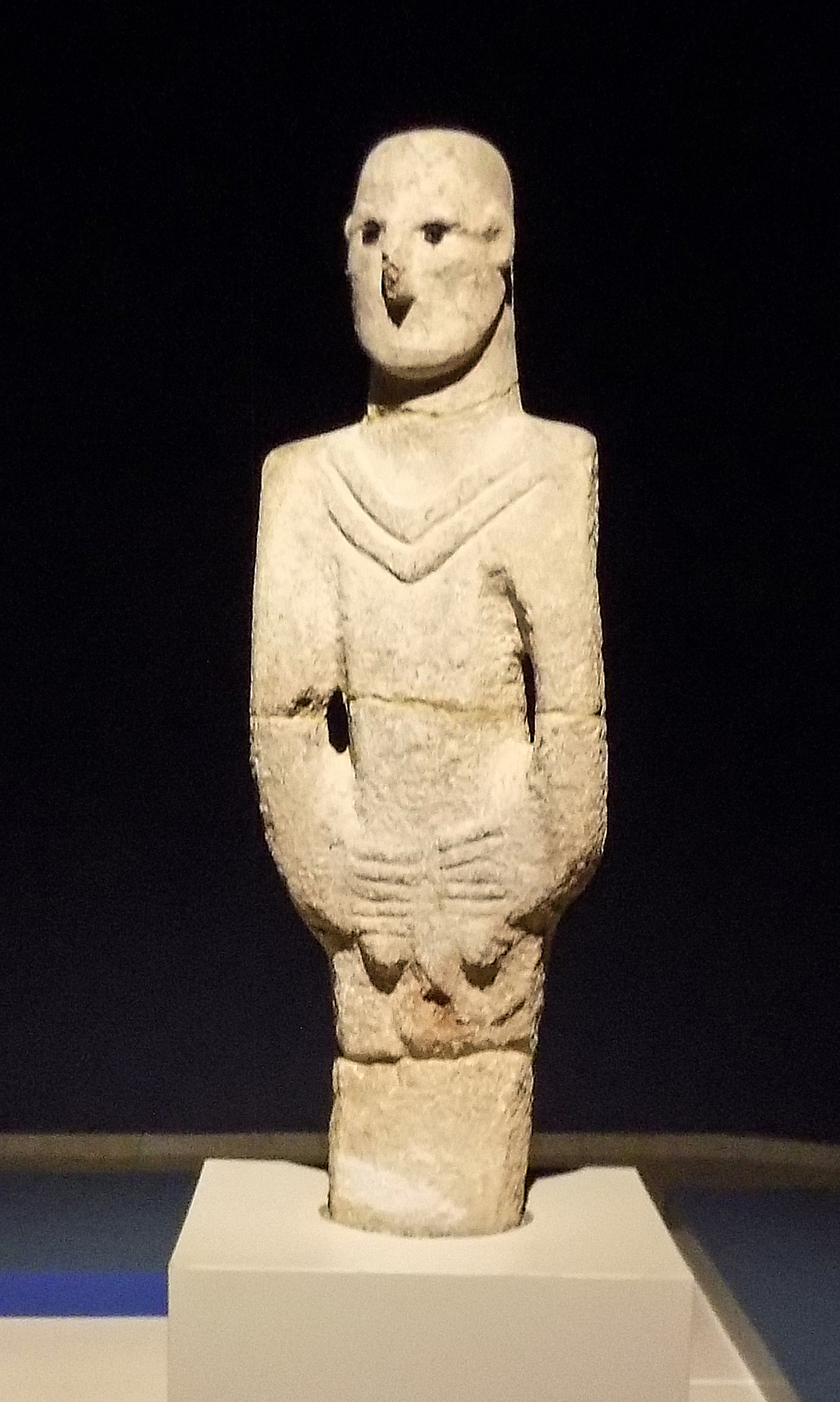
Urfa Man, c. 9000 BCE.

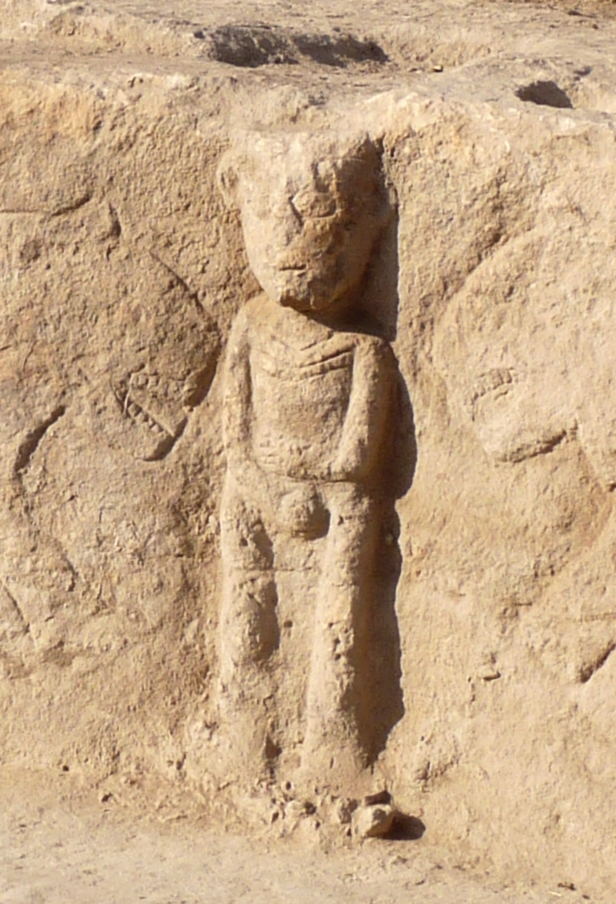
Sayburç Man, 9th millennium BCE

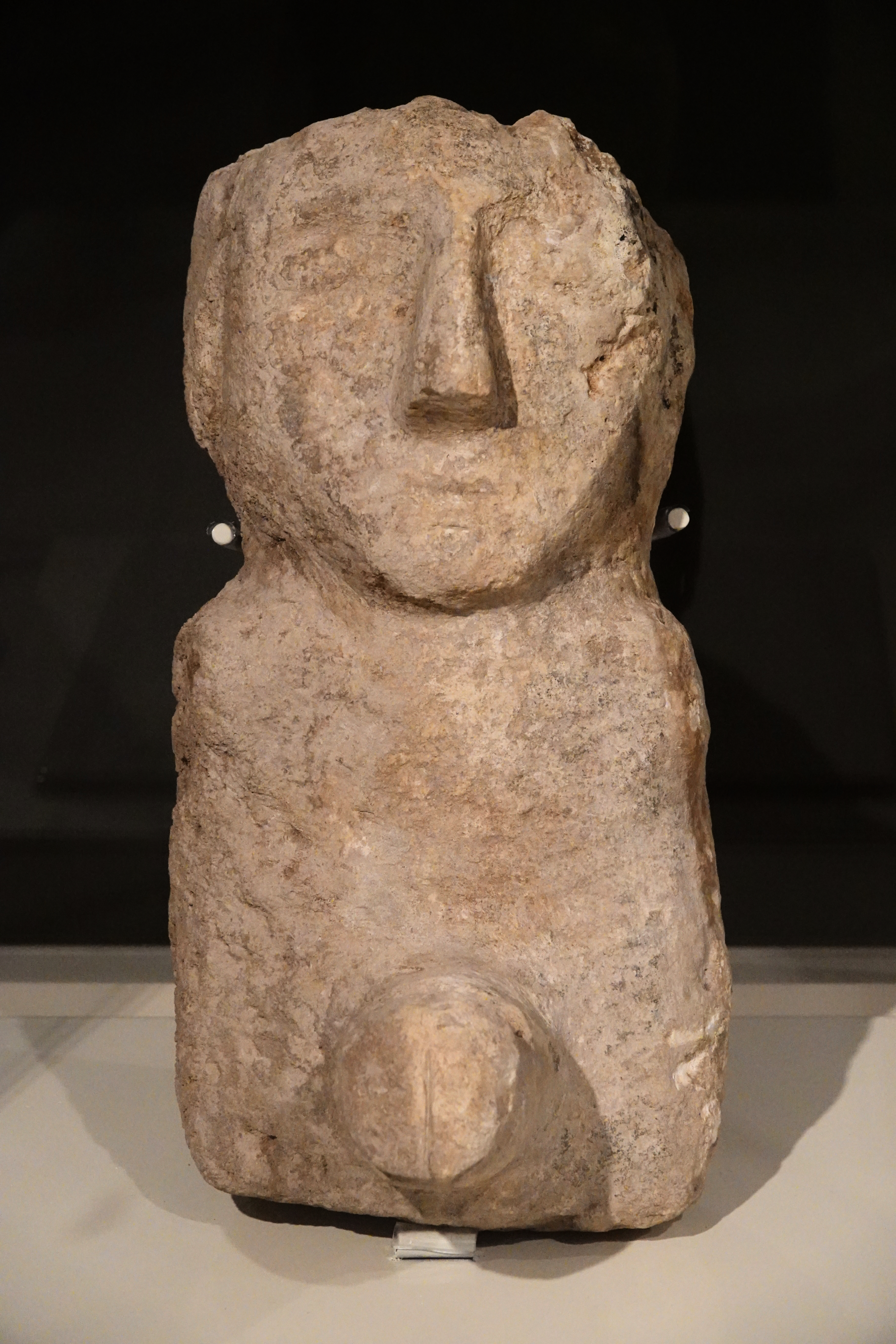
Göbekli Tepe ityphallic protome.

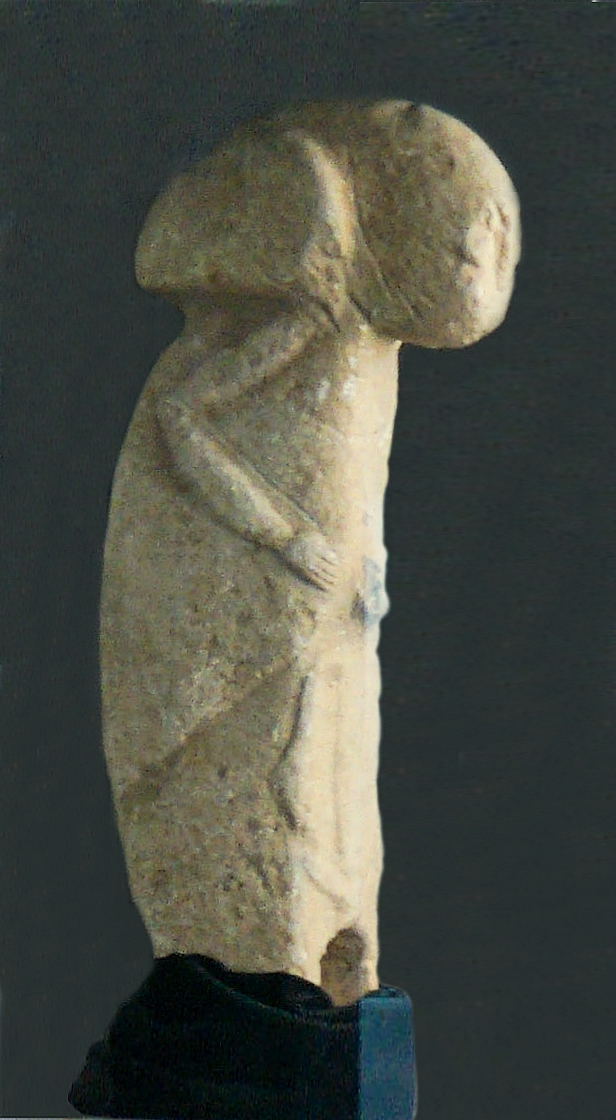
Kilisik sculpture

== Daily artifacts ==
Some of the sites of the Taş Tepeler culture have provided artifacts which are characteristic of the Pre-Pottery Neolithic or Neolithic periods. Ayanlar Höyük, an early to mid Pre-Pottery Neolithic B site had stone vessels and stone plates (typical utensils before the advent of pottery), some of them decorated with animal motifs, as well as grindstones.

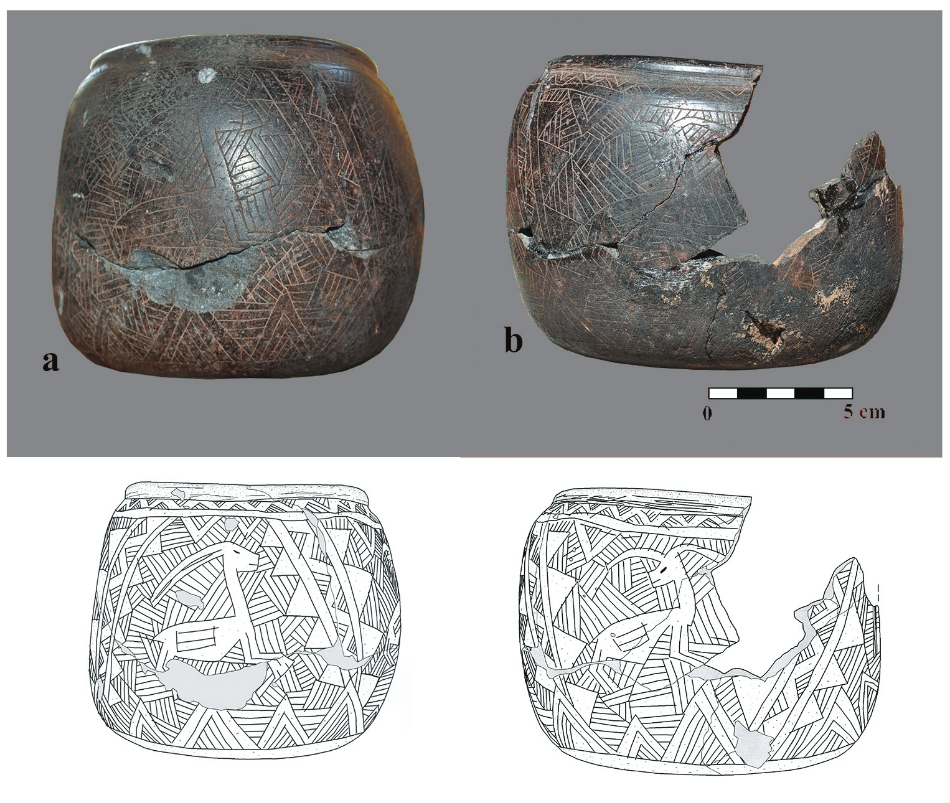
Stone vessels decorated with animal motif, Ayanlar Höyük (8800-7000 BCE)

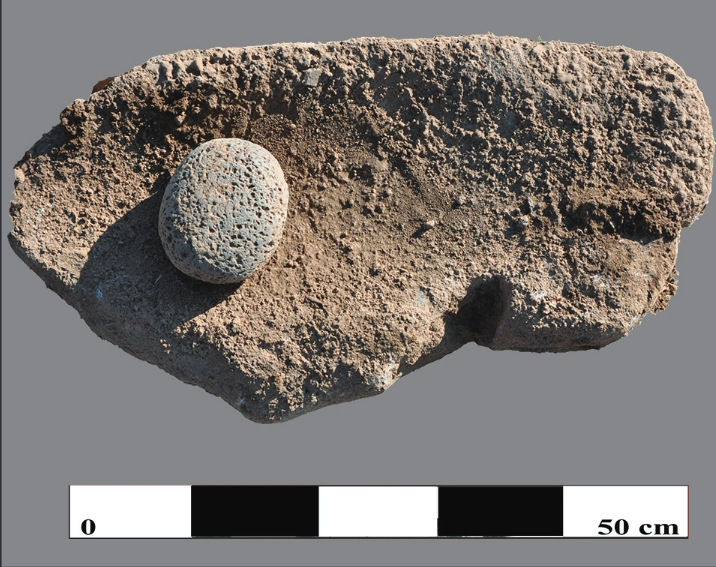
Top and bottom grindstone from Ayanlar Höyük (8800-7000 BCE)

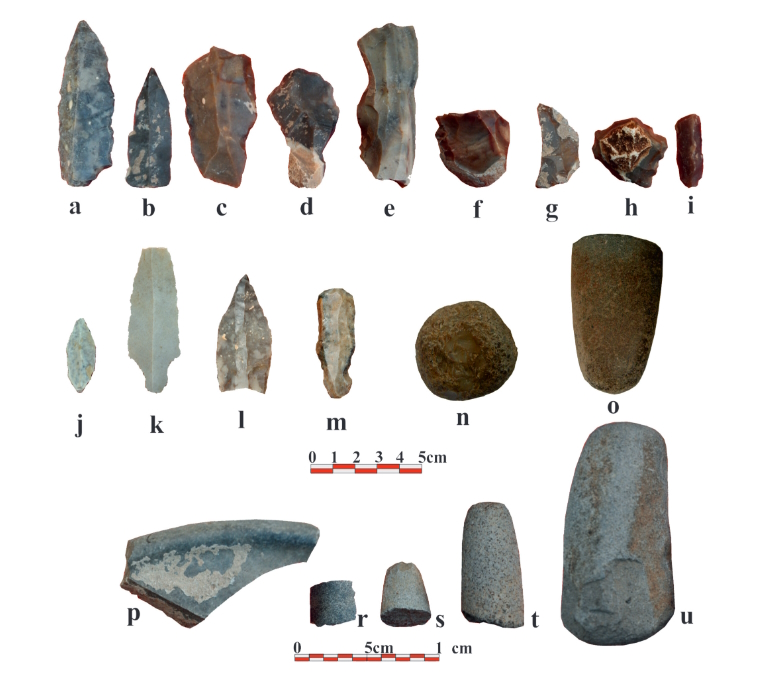
Blades and stone implements, Ayanlar Höyük (8800-7000 BCE)

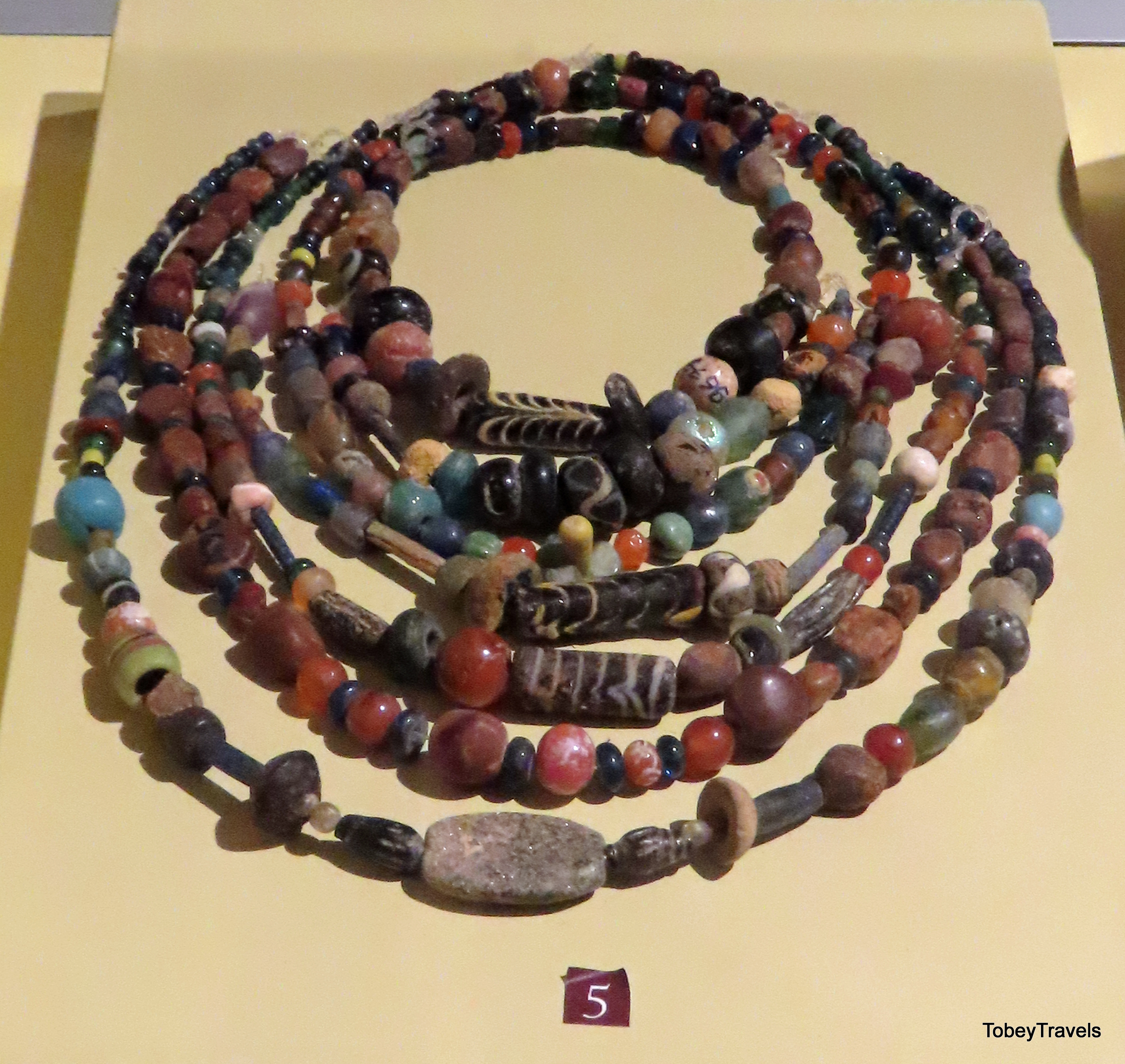
Stone necklace, Boncuklu Tarla (8800-6000 BCE)

== Sites ==
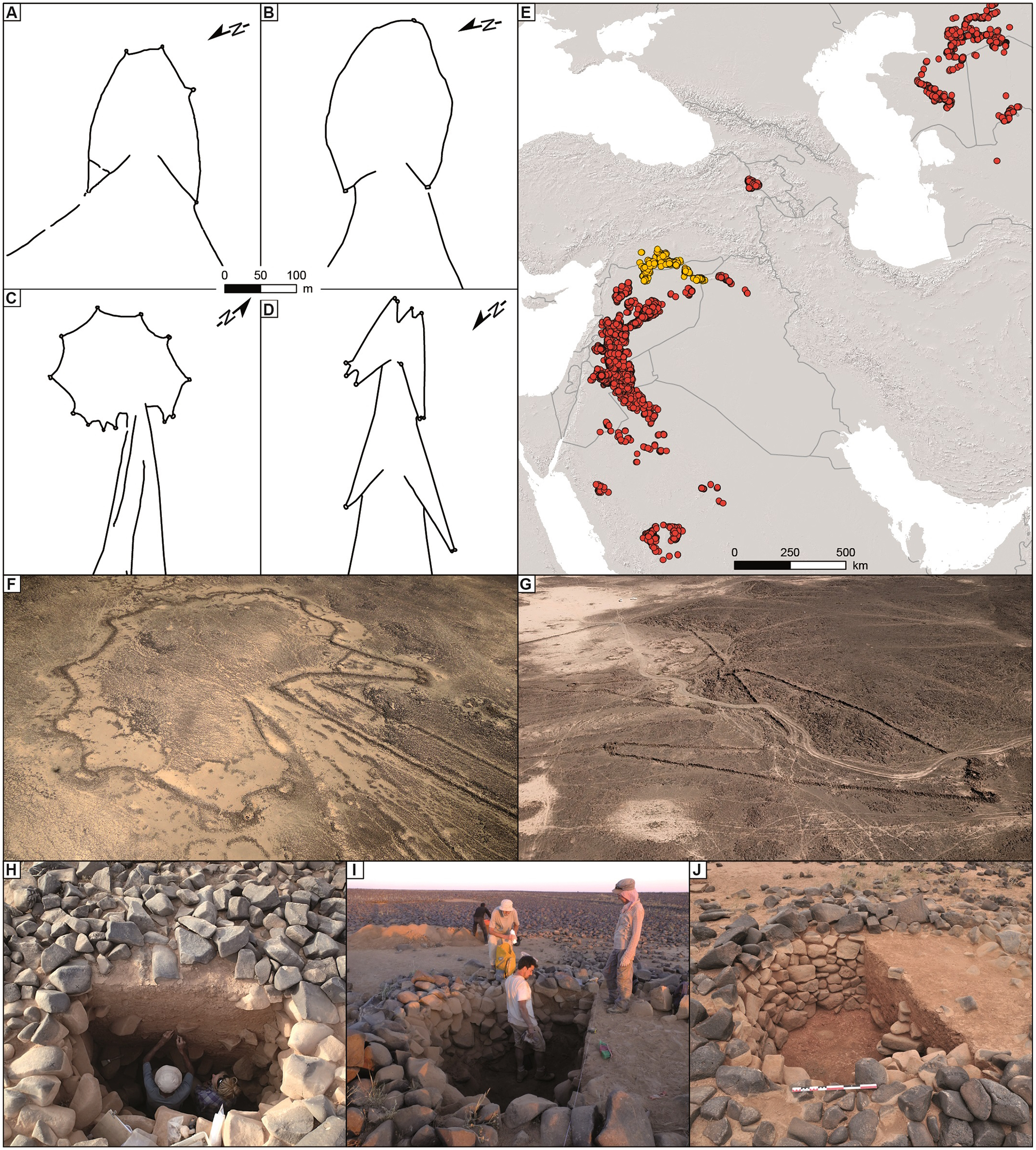
Distribution and characterization of West Asia desert kites. Gokbekli Tepe area in yellow (●)

=== Monumental structures ===
The sites include Göbekli Tepe, a UNESCO World Heritage Site, and at least eleven others: Nevalı Çori, Yeni Mahalle, Karahan Tepe, Hamzan Tepe, Sefer Tepe, Taşlı Tepe, Kurt Tepe, Harbetsuvan Tepe, Sayburç, Ayanlar Höyük, Çakmaktepe. They are currently being investigated and conserved under the 'Şanlıurfa Neolithic Research Project', a collaboration between Turkish and international researchers.

=== Desert kites for animal hunting ===
Desert kites are associated or proximate with some of the sites. These desert kites were extensive dry stone-wall structures, often several hundred meters in length, designed to mass-channel and trap wild-game such as gazelles. They are composed of long driving lines leading to a trap enclosure, often surrounded by a number of small cells. In the Upper Mesopotamia region, these desert kites were likely contemporary with Göbekli Tepe, and suggest efforts at capturing and controlling animal populations, possibly with an intent to store and consume meat resources with a long-term perspective. These desert kites can be understood as an early experiment towards sedentarism and domestication. The study of desert kites is a part of the Taş Tepeler archaeological program run by the Turkish Ministry of Culture, with the intent to investigate the origins of sedentism and agropastoral lifeways in the region.

== Genetics ==
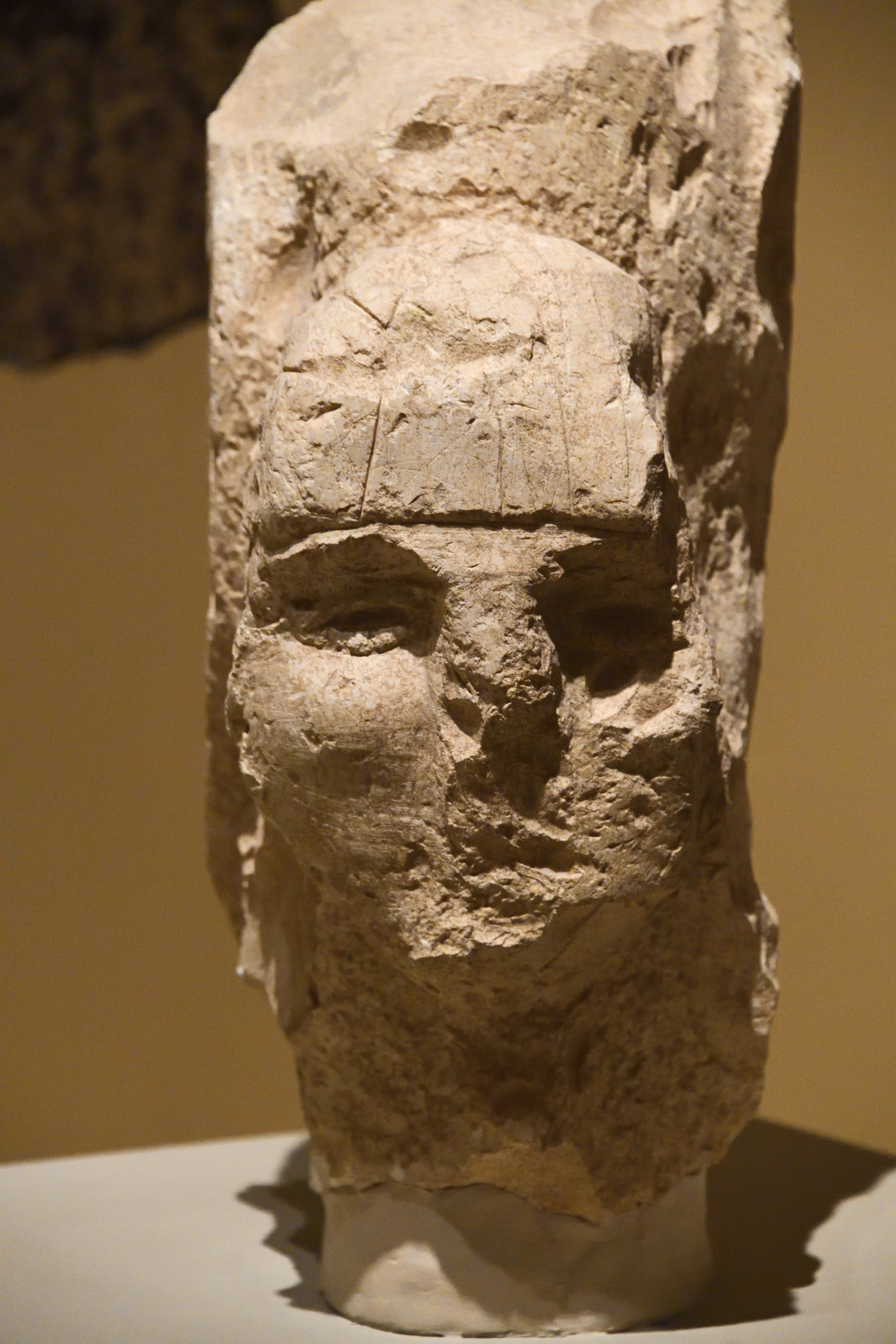
Nevalı Çori sculpted head, 8400-8100 BCE (Urfa Museum)

Human samples from Boncuklu Tarla (dated to 9000-8500 BCE), and Çayönü (dated to circa 8300-7500 BCE), were part of a recent genetic study, as members of a Mesopotamia_Neolithic cluster (together with a few Nemrik 9 samples). In this study, the Mesopotamia_Neolithic cluster appeared as a major ancestry of several Levantine and Egyptian Bronze Age individuals, particularly from Ebla, Ashkalon, Baq'ah and Nuwayrat.

Bronze Age samples and locations and dates of Mesopotamia_Neolithic ancestry: Nemrik 9 (9500-8000 BCE), Boncuklu (9000-8500 BCE), Çayönü (8300-7500 BCE).

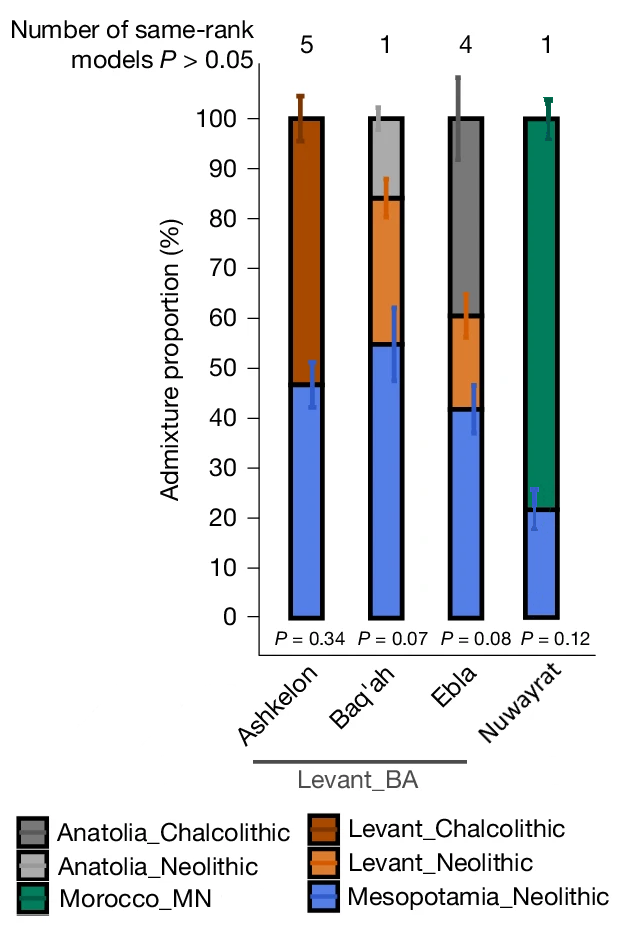
Ancestry proportions of Ascalon, Ebla, Baq'ah and Nuwayrat Bronze Age samples from the Mesopotamia_Neolithic cluster ( ), from the best-fit full model (qpAdm).

The Nuwayrat individual in particular, an Old Kingdom adult male Egyptian of relatively high-status radiocarbon-dated to 2855–2570 BCE and dubbed "Old Kingdom individual (NUE001)", was found to be associated with North African Neolithic ancestry, but about 24% of his genetic ancestry could be sourced to the eastern Fertile Crescent, including Mesopotamia, corresponding to the Mesopotamia_Neolithic cluster. The genetic profile was most closely represented by a two-source model, in which 77.6% ± 3.8% of the ancestry corresponded to genomes from the Middle Neolithic Moroccan site of Skhirat-Rouazi (dated to 4780–4230 BCE), which itself consists of predominantly (76.4 ± 4.0%) Levant Neolithic ancestry and (23.6 ± 4.0%) minor Iberomaurusian ancestry, while the remainder (22.4% ± 3.8%) was most closely related to known genomes from Neolithic Mesopotamia (dated to 9000-8000 BCE). No other two-source model met the significance criteria (P>0.05). A total of two Three-source models also emerged, but had similar ancestry proportions, with the addition of a much smaller third-place component from the Neolithic/Chalcolithic Levant. According to Lazardis, “What this sample does tell us is that at such an early date there were people in Egypt that were mostly North African in ancestry, but with some contribution of ancestry from Mesopotamia". According to Girdland-Flink, the fact that 20% of the man’s ancestry best matches older genomes from Mesopotamia, suggests that the movement of Mesopotamian people into Egypt may have been fairly substantial at some point.

The timing of the admixture event cannot be calculated directly from the 2025 genetic study. The 2025 study showed that the Nuwayrat sample had the greatest affinity with samples from Neolithic Mesopotamia dating to 9000-8000 BCE. Concurrently, other studies have shown that during the Neolithic, in the 10,000-5,000 BCE period, populations from Mesopotamia and the Zagros expanded into the Near-East, particularly Anatolia, bringing with them the Neolithic package of technological innovation (domesticated plants, pottery, greater sedentism). Egypt may also have been affected by such migratory movements. Further changes in odontometrics and dental tissues have been observed in the Nile Valley around 6000 BCE. Subsequent cultural influxes from Mesopotamia are documented into the 4th millennium (3999-3000 BCE) with the appearance of Late Uruk features during the Late Pre-dynastic period of Egypt.

== Sources ==
- Çelik, Bahattin (2010). "Hamzan Tepe in the light of new finds". Documenta Praehistorica. 37: 257–268. doi:10.4312/dp.37.22.
- Celik, Bahattin (27 December 2017). "A new Pre-Pottery Neolithic site in Southeastern Turkey: Ayanlar Höyük (Gre Hut)". Documenta Praehistorica. 44: 360–367. doi:10.4312/dp.44.22. ISSN 1854-2492.
- Dietrich, Oliver (8 May 2016a). "The current distribution of sites with T-shaped pillars". Tepe Telegrams.
- Güler, Mustafa; Çelik, Bahattin; Güler, Gül (2012). "New pre-pottery neolithic settlements from Viranşehir District". Anadolu / Anatolia. 38: 164–80. doi:10.1501/Andl_0000000398.
- Peters, Joris; Schmidt, Klaus (2004). "Animals in the Symbolic World of Pre-Pottery Neolithic Göbekli Tepe, South-eastern Turkey: A Preliminary Assessment". Anthropozoologica. 39.
