= Stone vessel =

Hollow container, made of stone

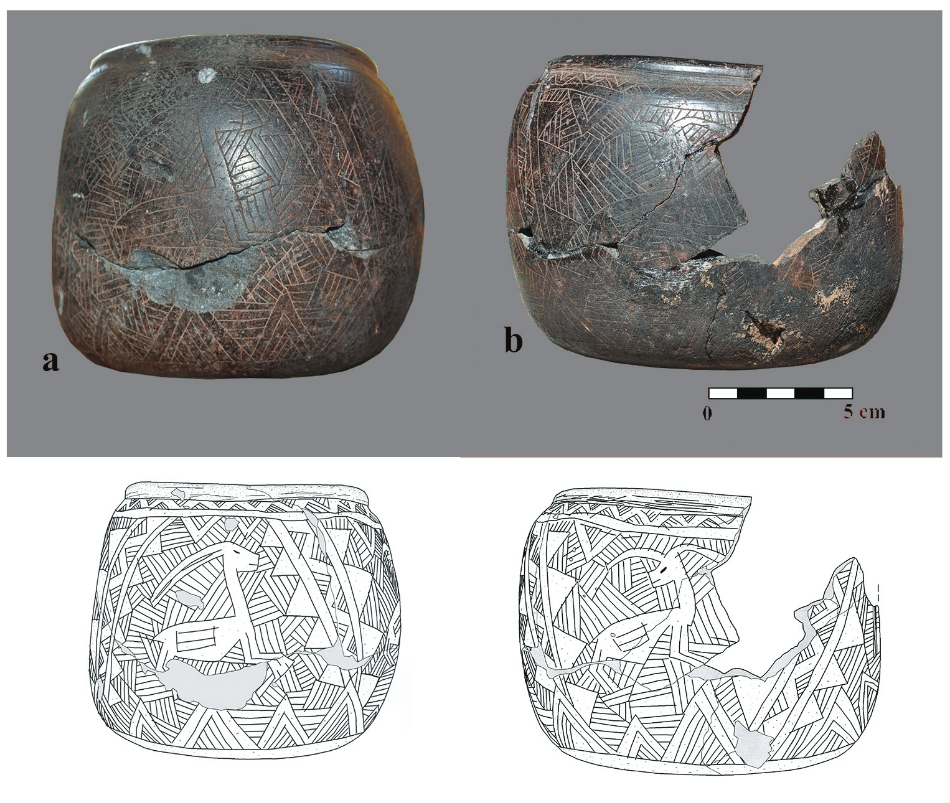
Stone vessels decorated with animal motif, Ayanlar Höyük (8800-7000 BCE)

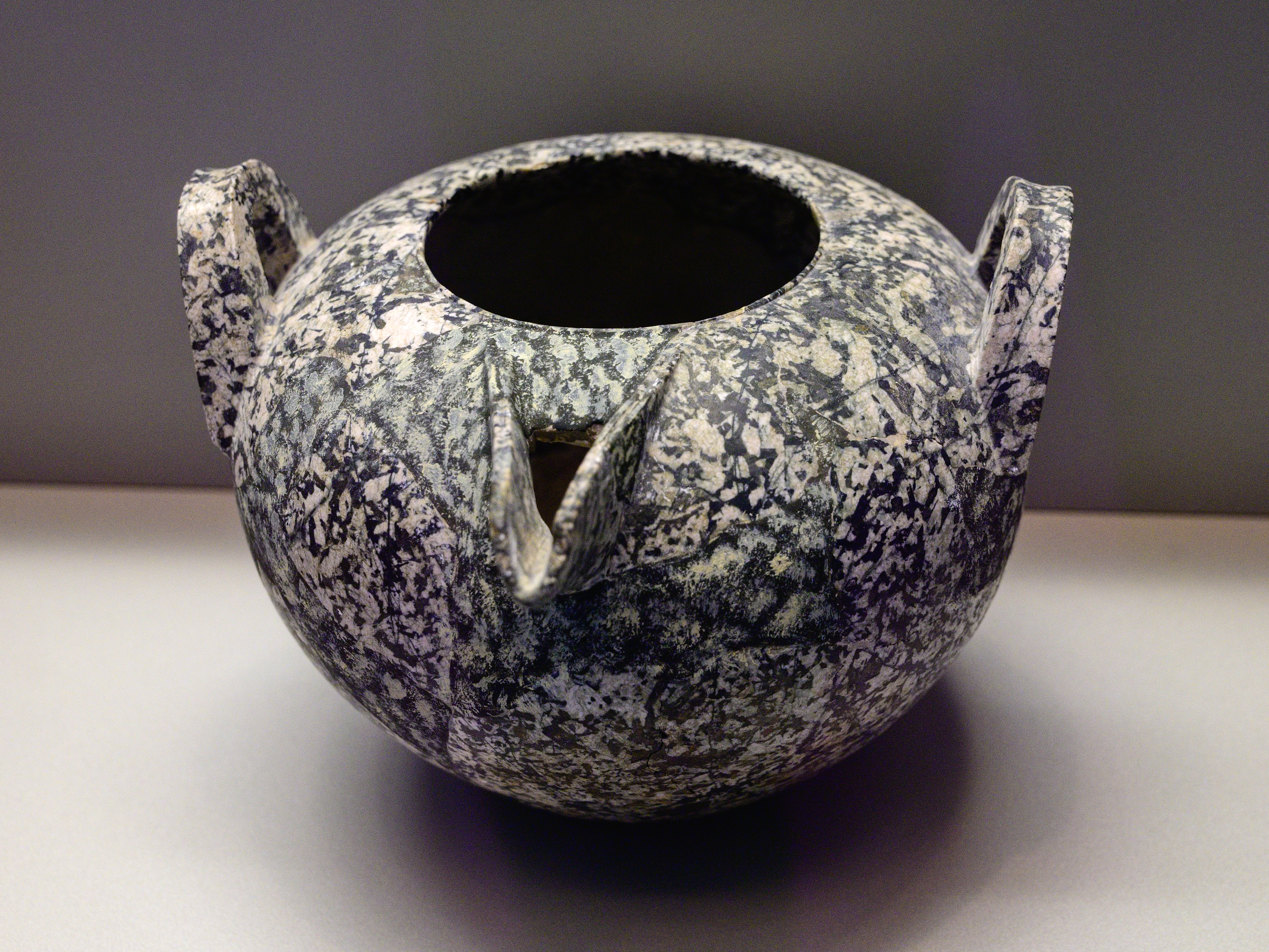
Mycenaean stone vessel. Late Bronze Age. National Archaeological Museum of Athens.

A stone vessel is a hollow container made of stone. The scope of such vessels usually excludes pottery fired from clay (stoneware) and instead concentrates on those carved from a solid chunk of natural stone.

Stone mortars and pestles have been used by the Kebaran culture (the Levant with Sinai) from 22000 to 18000 BC to crush grains and other plant material. The Kebaran mortars that have been found are sculpted, slightly conical bowls of porous stone.

More than 600 stone vessels were found at Early Neolithic Göbekli Tepe. The vessel assemblage is made up of small and middle-sized limestone vessels, big limestone troughs, limestone platters and fragments of 'greenstone' vessels.

In the 3rd millennium BCE, chlorite stone artifacts were very popular, and traded widely. These carved dark stone vessels have been found everywhere in ancient Mesopotamia. They rarely exceed 25 cm in height, and may have been filled with precious oils. They often carry human and animal motifs inlaid with semi-precious stones.

"Elaborate stone vessels carved with repeating designs, both geometric and naturalistic, in an easily recognizable "intercultural style", were made primarily of chlorite; a number were produced at the important site of Tepe Yahya southeast of Kerman (Iran) in the middle and late 3rd millennium b.c.e. Some of these vessels were painted natural color (dark green) and inlaid with pastes and shell, and some have even been found with cuneiform inscriptions referring to rulers and known Sumerian deities. More than 500 vessels and vessel fragments carved in this style have been recovered from sites ranging from Uzbekistan and the Indus Valley (e.g., Mohenjo-daro) in the east to Susa and all the major Sumerian sites in Mesopotamia, including Mari, in the west and to the Persian Gulf, particularly Tarut and the Failaka Islands, in the south."

Stone vessels in Ancient Egypt are among the commonest finds in the elite tombs of Predynastic and Early Dynastic Egypt.

The Plain of Jars is a megalithic archaeological landscape in Laos. It consists of thousands of stone jars scattered around the upland valleys and the lower foothills of the central plain of the Xiangkhoang Plateau. The jars are arranged in clusters ranging in number from one to several hundred.

Giant jars of Assam - giant mysterious jars have been unearthed across four sites in Assam, India. Hundreds of them are spread across a 300 square kilometer swath of Assam. The jars may have been used for ancient human burial practices.

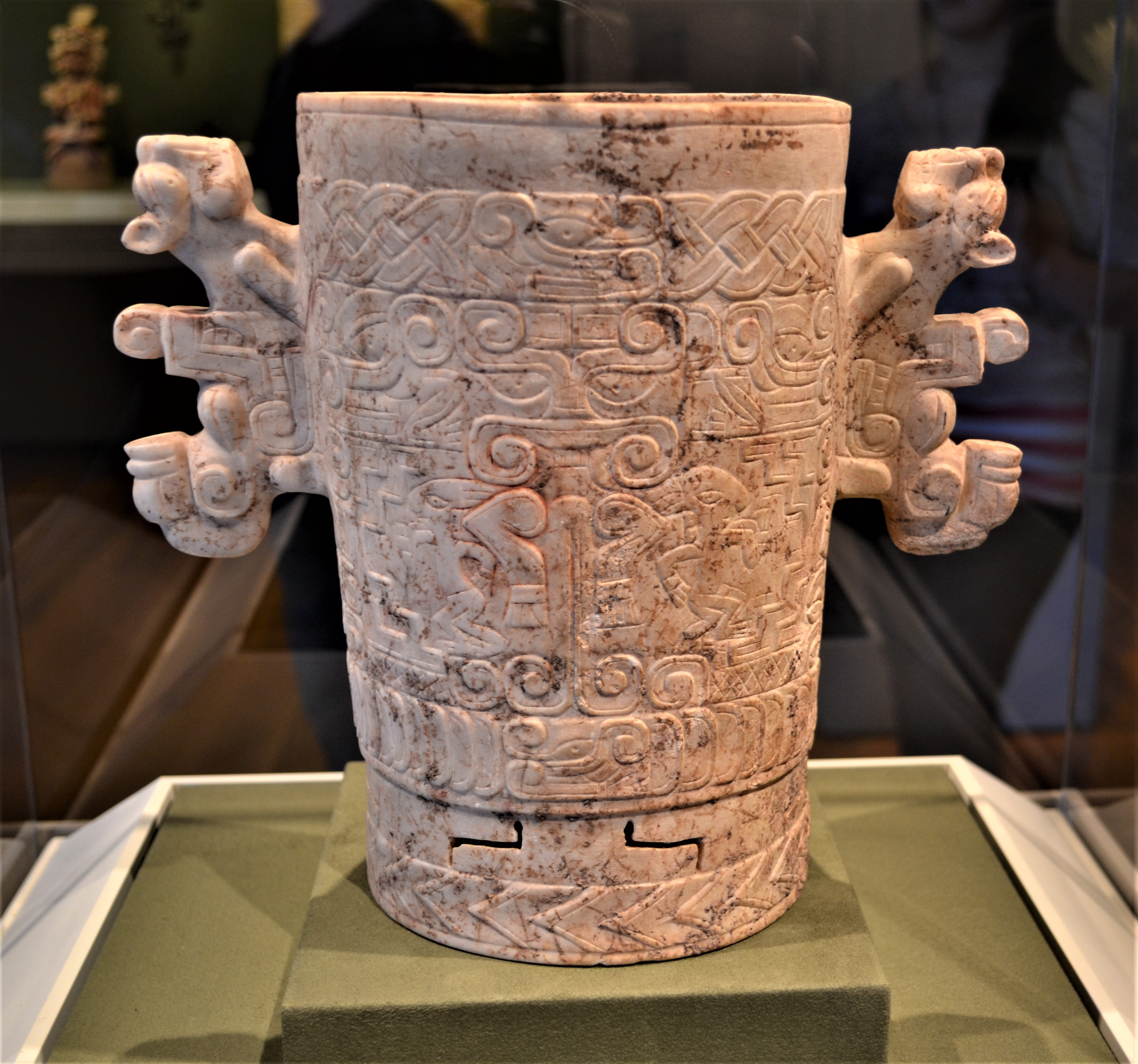
Marble Vessel. Northwest Honduras, Ulúa Valley, 700-1000 CE

== America ==
In temperate eastern North America, steatite vessels have an unusual distribution - widespread (ranging from New Brunswick, Canada to Louisiana) but apparently short-lived (approximately 1800 - 800 B.C.).

The Ulua Marble Vases from the Ulua Valley in Honduras are dated 600-800 CE.

== Middle East ==
=== The Levant ===
Stone vessels in ancient Judea made of soft limestone, were used by Jews throughout the region during the Second Temple period and beyond. They first appeared during the early 1st century BCE and were gradually phased out during the following centuries. Their use in Judea was originally thought to have ceased after the destruction of the Second Temple in 70 CE, though through their discovery in Jewish sites such as Jericho and Shuafat, it became clear that their use continued until the Bar Kokhba revolt (132-135 CE). By contrast, in Galilee they continued to be used until at least the 4th century CE. Stone vessels were found in all the regions that were densely populated by Jews according to historical sources, and in all settlements which also contained ritual baths.

== See also ==
- Pottery
- Stone carving
- Dolsot
- Stone vessels' cave
- Hardstone carving
