= Sefer Tepe =

Archaeological site in Turkey

Coordinates: 37.1722476°N 39.4900343°E

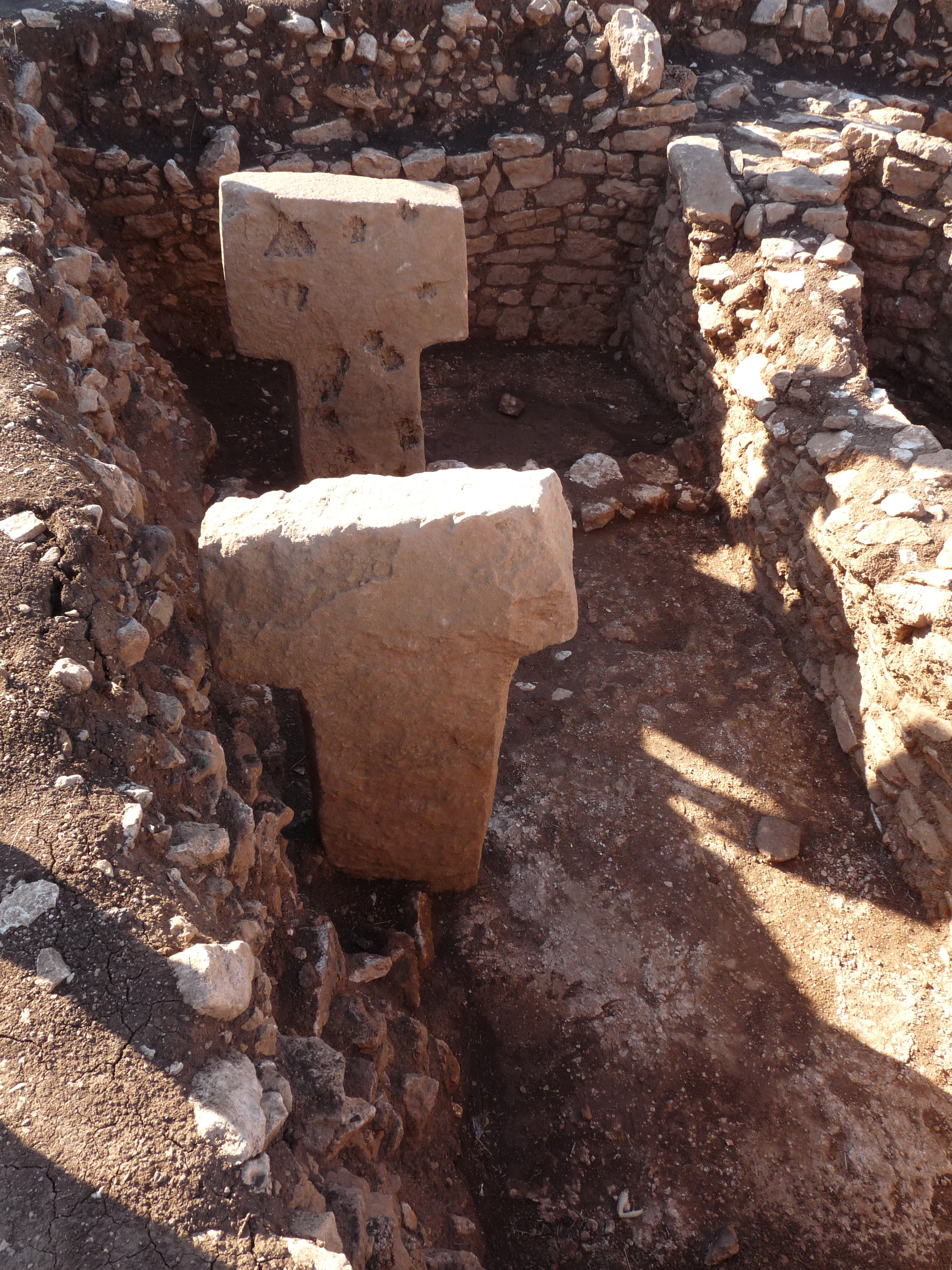
Sefer Tepe T-shaped stelae

Sefer Tepe is a Pre-Pottery Neolithic A archaeological site in the Urfa region of Turkey. It participates to the T-shaped pillar tradition seen at Göbekli Tepe. It is part of the Taş Tepeler culture.

== Archaeology ==
In November 2025, archaeologists uncovered two Neolithic human-face reliefs carved on limestone blocks of a platform structure, estimated to be around 10,000 years old. One relief is executed in high relief with detailed facial features, while the second is carved in low relief with more stylized characteristics; both are oriented northward.

== Sources ==
- Çelik, Bahattin (2010). "Hamzan Tepe in the light of new finds". Documenta Praehistorica. 37: 257–268. doi:10.4312/dp.37.22.
- Güler, Mustafa; Çelik, Bahattin; Güler, Gül (2012). "New pre-pottery neolithic settlements from Viranşehir District". Anadolu / Anatolia. 38: 164–80. doi:10.1501/Andl_0000000398.
