= Nevalı Çori =

Early Neolithic settlement and archaeological site in Turkey

- Turkish: Nevali Çori; Kurdish: Newala Çorî
- Location within Turkey Nevalı Çori (Near East)
- 37°31′6″N 38°36′20″E
- Periods: Pre-Pottery Neolithic B
- Location: Hilvan, Şanlıurfa Province, Turkey
- Region: Mesopotamia

History
- Built: 8400 BC
- Abandoned: 8100 BC

Site notes
- Condition: Submerged

Nevalı Çori (Turkish: Nevali Çori, Kurdish: Newala Çorî) was an early Neolithic settlement on the middle Euphrates, in Şanlıurfa Province, Southeastern Anatolia, Turkey. It is dated to the Pre-Pottery Neolithic B period, from 8400 to 8100 BC, and is part of the "Taş Tepeler" sites. The site is known for having some of the world's oldest known temples and monumental sculpture. Together with the earlier site of Göbekli Tepe and other Taş Tepeler sites, it has revolutionised scientific understanding of the Eurasian Neolithic period. The oldest domesticated Einkorn wheat was found there.

The settlement was located about 490 m above sea level, in the foothills of the Taurus Mountains, on both banks of the Kantara stream, a tributary of the Euphrates.

== Excavation ==
The site was examined from 1983 to 1991 in the context of rescue excavations during the erection of the Atatürk Dam below Samsat. Excavations were conducted by a team from the University of Heidelberg under the direction of Professor Harald Hauptmann. Together with numerous other archaeological sites in the vicinity, Nevalı Çori has since been inundated by the damming of the Euphrates.

== Archaeological chronology ==
Nevalı Çori could be placed within the local relative chronology on the basis of its flint tools. The occurrence of narrow unretouched Byblos-type points places it on Oliver Aurenche's Phase 3, i.e. early to middle Pre-Pottery Neolithic B (PPNB). Some tools indicate continuity into Phase 4, which is similar in date to Late PPNB. An even finer chronological distinction within Phase 3 is permitted by the settlement's architecture; the house type with underfloor channels, typical of Nevalı Çori strata I-IV, also characterises the "Intermediate Layer" at Çayönü, while the differing plan of the single building in stratum V, House 1, is more clearly connected to the buildings of the "Cellular Plan Layer" at Çayönü.

=== Common date ===
In terms of absolute dates, four radiocarbon dates have been determined for Nevalı Çori. Three are from Stratum II and date it with some certainty to the second half of the 9th millennium BC, which coincides with early dates from Çayönü and with Mureybet IVA and thus supports the relative chronology above. The fourth dates to the 10th millennium BC, which, if correct, would indicate the presence of an extremely early phase of PPNB at Nevalı Çori.

== Houses ==
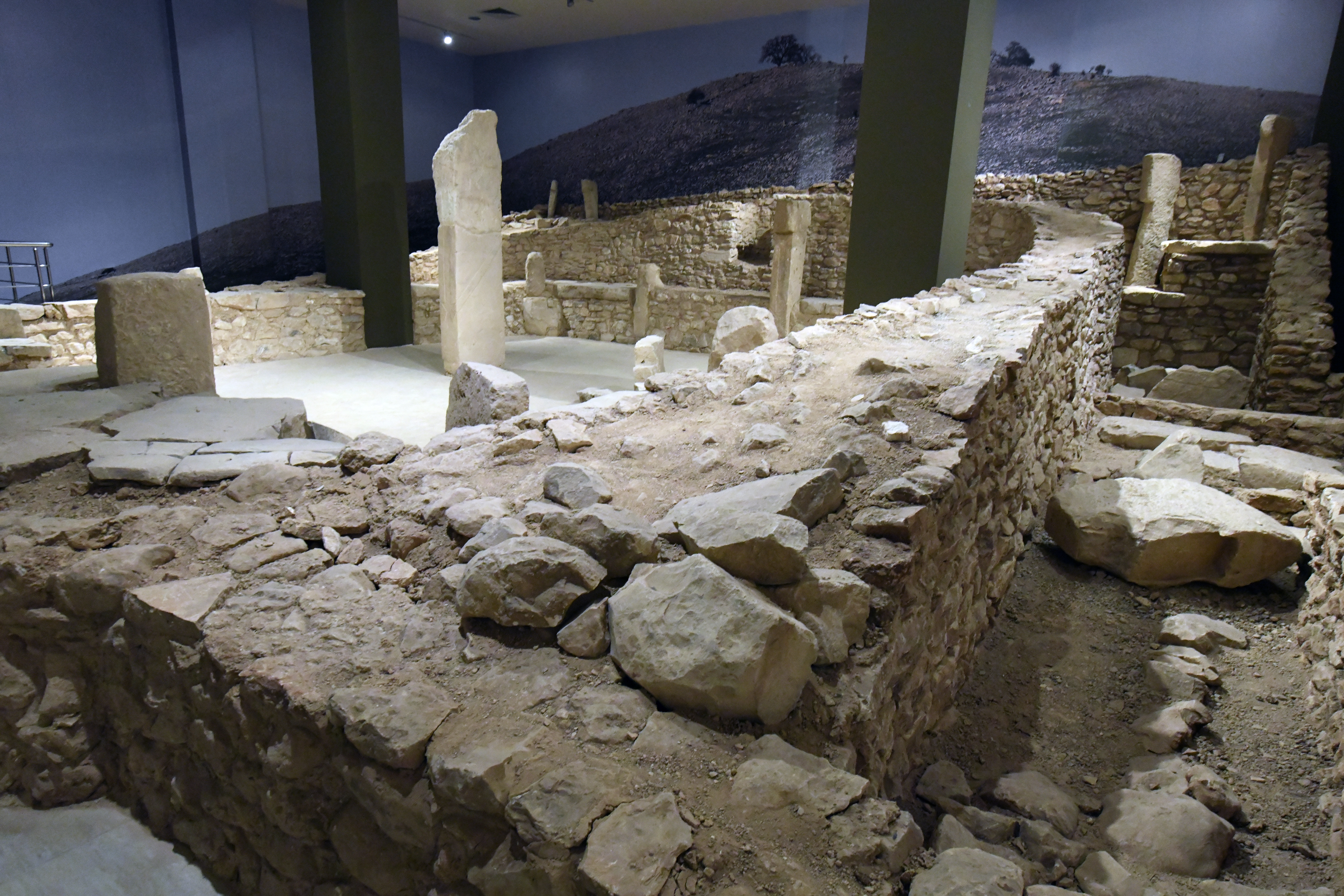
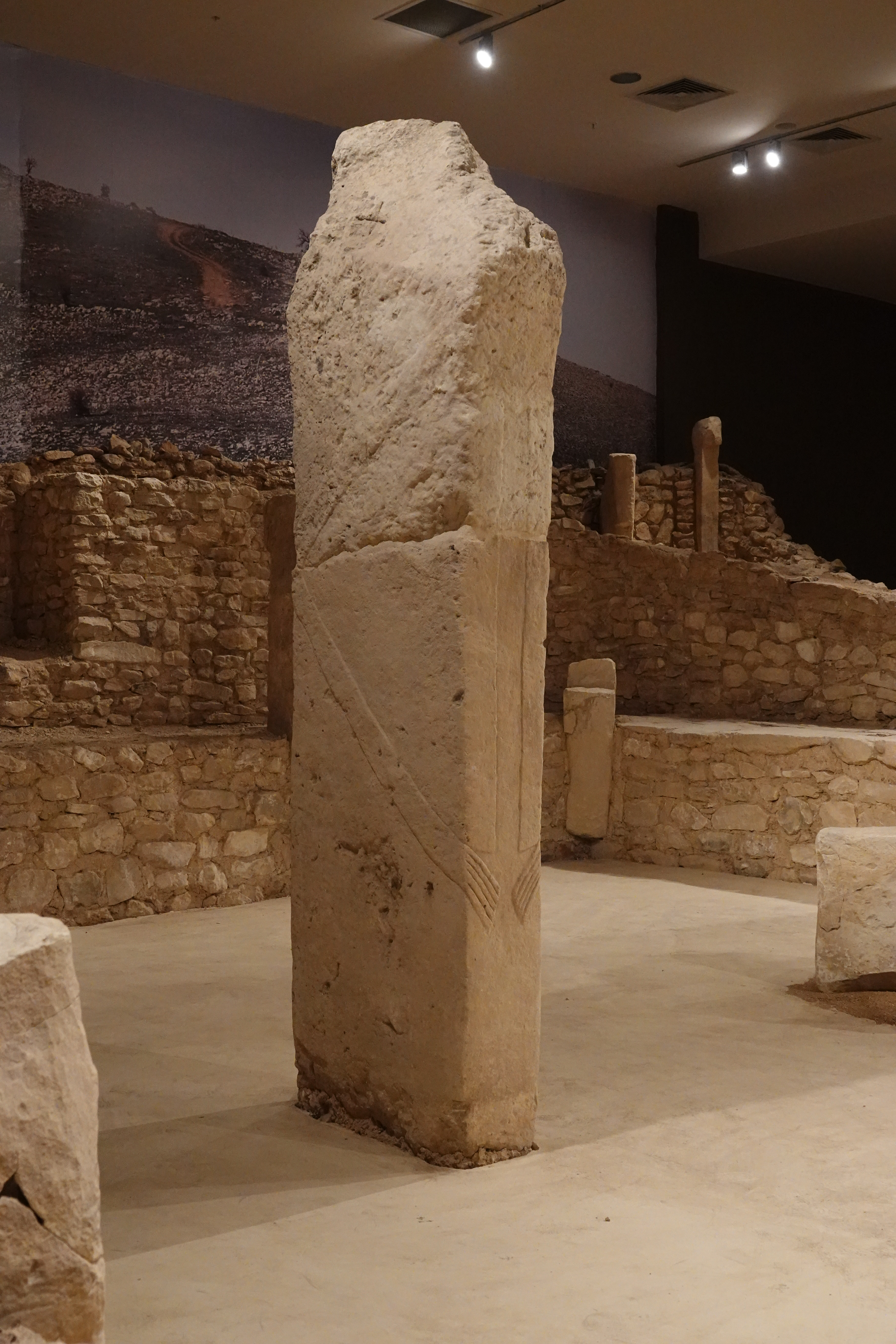
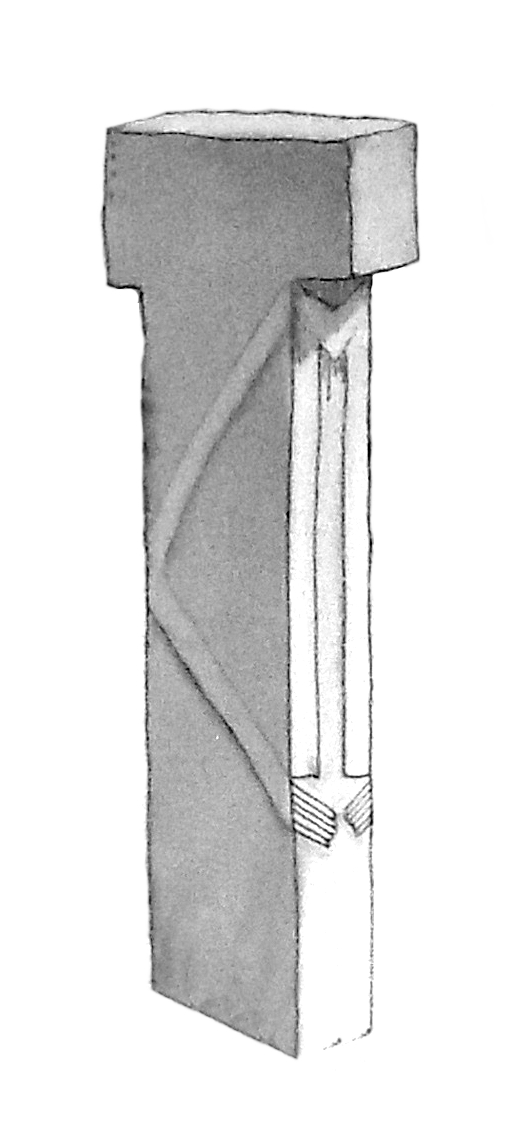
Nevali Cori Neolithic Temple (Obelisk Building). The central pillar has side-arms ending with hands, suggesting a symbolic anthropomorphic intent (see reconstructed drawing). Sanlıurfa Archaeology Museum.

The settlement had five architectural levels. The excavated architectural remains were of long rectangular houses containing two to three parallel flights of rooms, interpreted as mezzanines. These are adjacent to a similarly rectangular ante-structure, subdivided by wall projections, which should be seen as a residential space. This type of house is characterized by thick, multi-layered foundations made of large angular cobbles and boulders, the gaps filled with smaller stones so as to provide a relatively even surface to support the superstructure. These foundations are interrupted every 1-1.5m by underfloor channels, at right angles to the main axis of the houses, which were covered in stone slabs but open to the sides. They may have served the drainage, aeration or the cooling of the houses. 23 such structures were excavated, they are strikingly similar to structures from the so-called channeled subphase at Çayönü.

An area in the northwest part of the village appears to be of special importance. Here, a cult complex had been cut into the hillside. It had three subsequent architectural phases, the most recent belonging to Stratum III, the middle one to Stratum II and the oldest to Stratum I. The two more recent phases also possessed a terrazzo-style lime cement floor, which did not survive from the oldest phase. Parallels are known from Cayönü and Göbekli Tepe. Monolithic pillars similar to those at Göbekli Tepe were built into its dry stone walls, its interior contained two free-standing pillars of 3 m height. The excavator assumes light flat roofs. Similar structures are only known from Göbekli Tepe so far.

Soundings cut to examine the western side of the valley also revealed rectilinear architecture in 2-3 layers.

== Sculpture and clay figurines ==
Sculpted head (Urfa Museum)

The local limestone was carved into numerous statues and smaller sculptures, including a more than life-sized bare human head with a snake or sikha-like tuft. There is also a statue of a bird. Some of the pillars also bore reliefs, including ones of human hands. The free-standing anthropomorphic figures of limestone excavated at Nevalı Çori belong to the earliest known life-size sculptures. Comparable material has been found at Göbekli Tepe.

Several hundred small clay figurines (about 5 cm high), most of them depicting humans, have been interpreted as votive offerings. They were fired at temperatures between 500 and 600 °C, which suggests the development of ceramic firing technology before the advent of pottery proper.

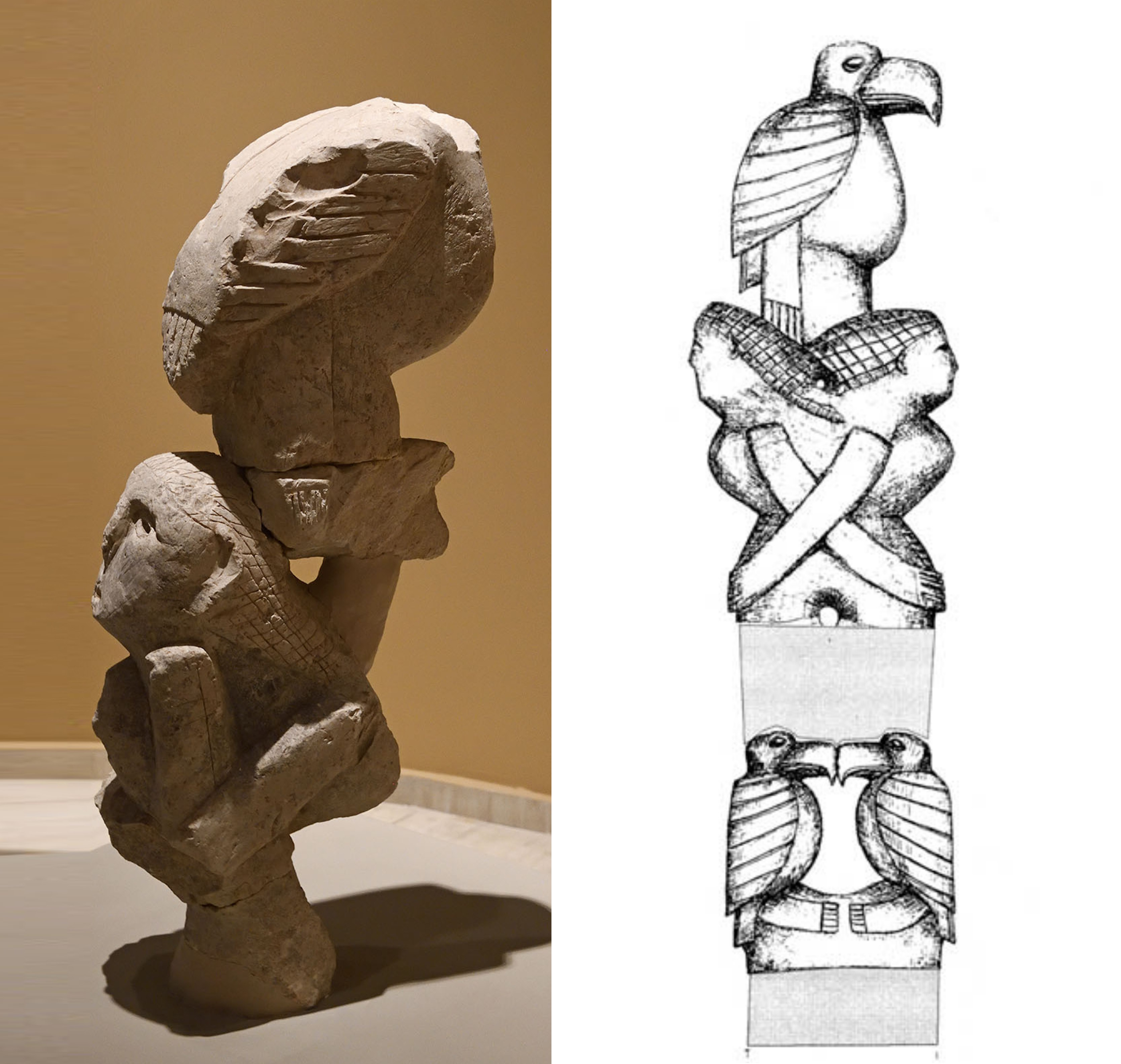
Tentative reconstruction of the ‘totem pole’ from Nevalı Çori

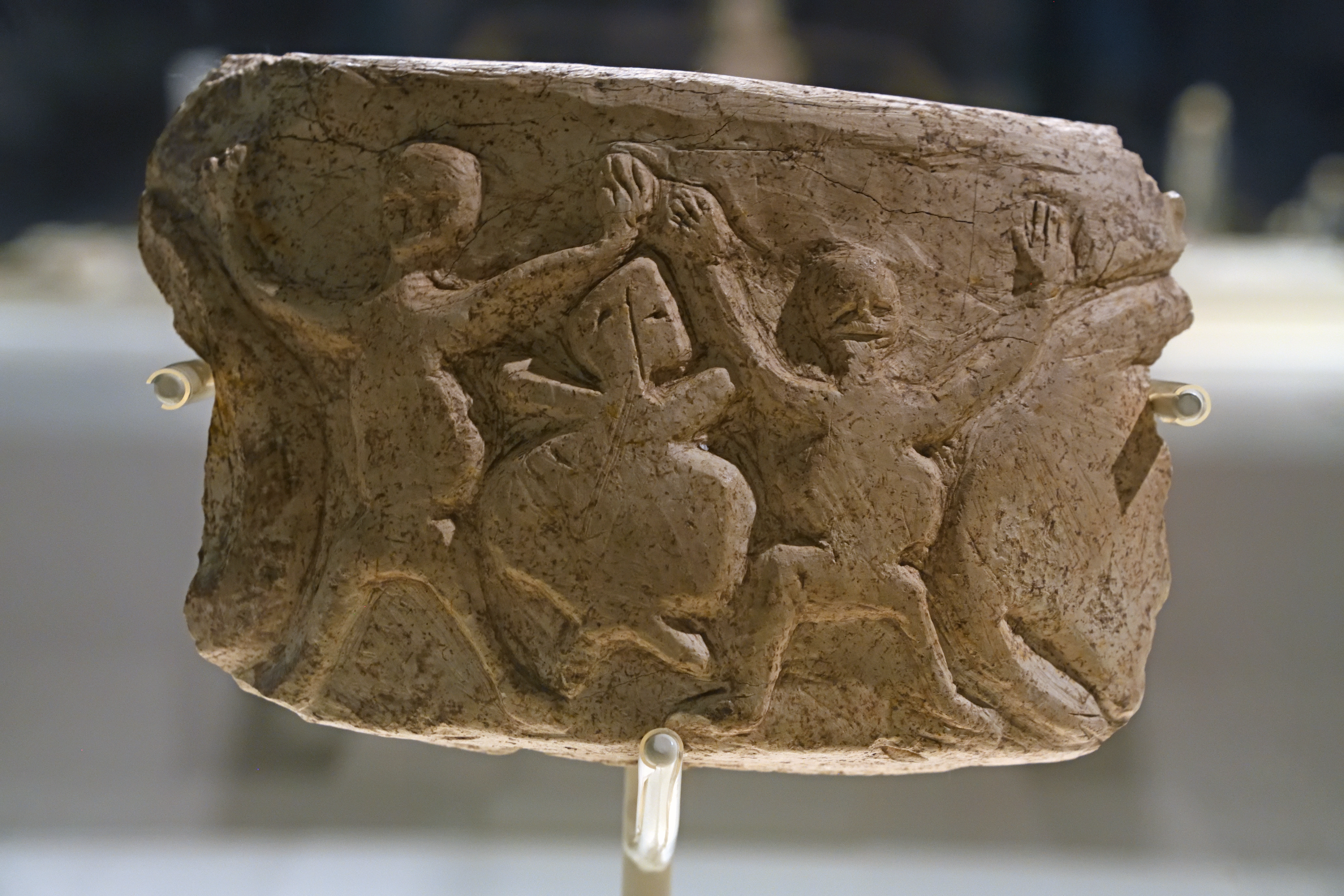
Group scene (Urfa Museum)

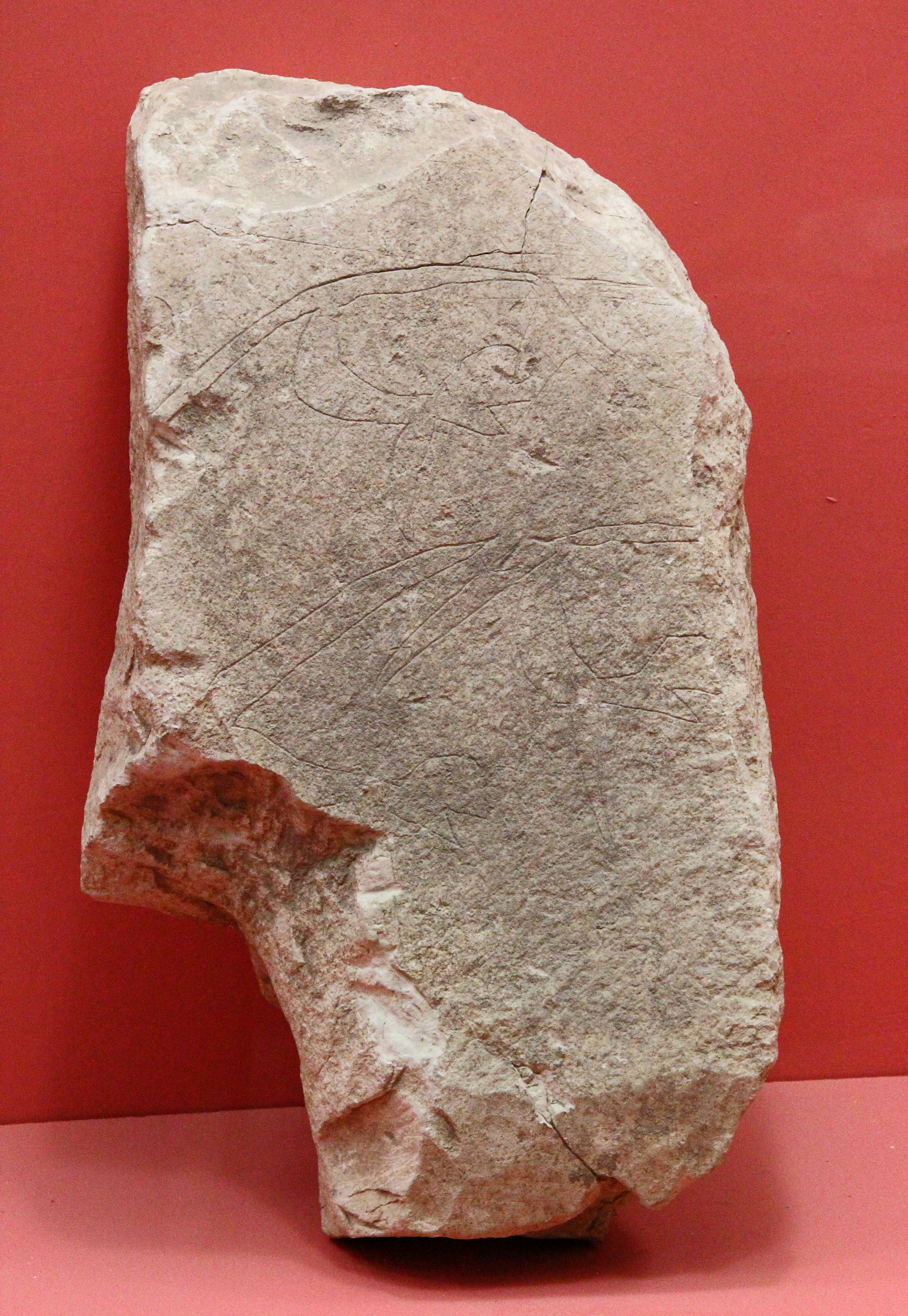
Fragment of Neolithic art from Nevalı Çori depicting a hunting scene

== Bas relief ==
A bas relief on a fragment of a limestone bowl depicts two humans and one tortoise-like creature dancing.

== Burials ==
Some of the houses contained depositions of human skulls and incomplete skeletons.

== Literature ==
- Badisches Landesmuseum Karlsruhe (ed.): Die ältesten Monumente der Menschheit. Vor 12.000 Jahren in Anatolien, Begleitbuch zur Ausstellung im Badischen Landesmuseum vom 20. Januar bis zum 17. Juni 2007. Theiss, Stuttgart 2007, ISBN 978-3-8062-2072-8.
- MediaCultura (Hrsg.): Die ältesten Monumente der Menschheit. Vor 12.000 Jahren in Anatolien. DVD-ROM. Theiss, Stuttgart 2007, ISBN 978-3-8062-2090-2.
- Hauptmann, H. Nevalı Çori: Architektur, Anatolica 15, (1988) 99-110.
- Hauptmann, H. Nevalı Çori: Eine Siedlung des akeramischen Neolithikums am mittleren Euphrat, Nürnberger Blätter 8/9, (1991/92) 15–33.
- Hauptmann, H., Ein Kultgebäude in Nevalı Çori, in: M. Frangipane u.a. (Hrsg.), Between the Rivers and over the Mountains, Archaeologica Anatolica et Mesopotamica Alba Palmieri dedicata, (Rome 1993), 37–69.
- Hauptmann, H., Frühneolithische Steingebäude in Südwestasien. In: Karl W. Beinhauer et al., Studien zur Megalithik: Forschungsstand und ethnoarchäologische Perspektiven / The megalithic phenomenon: recent research and ethnoarchaeological approaches, Beiträge zur Ur- und Frühgeschichte Mitteleuropas 21, (Mannheim 1999).
- Morsch, M., Magic figurines? A view from Nevalı Çori, in: H.G.K. Gebel, Bo Dahl Hermansen and Charlott Hoffmann Jensen. (Hrsg.) Magic Practices and Ritual in the Near Eastern Neolithic, SENEPSE 8 (Berlin 2002).
- Peters, Joris; Schmidt, Klaus (2004). "Animals in the Symbolic World of Pre-Pottery Neolithic Göbekli Tepe, South-eastern Turkey: A Preliminary Assessment". Anthropozoologica. 39.
- Schmidt, K., Nevalı Çori: Zum Typenspektrum der Silexindustrie und der übrigen Kleinfunde, Anatolica 15, (1988) 161–202.
