= Sayburç =

Neolithic archaeological site in Turkey

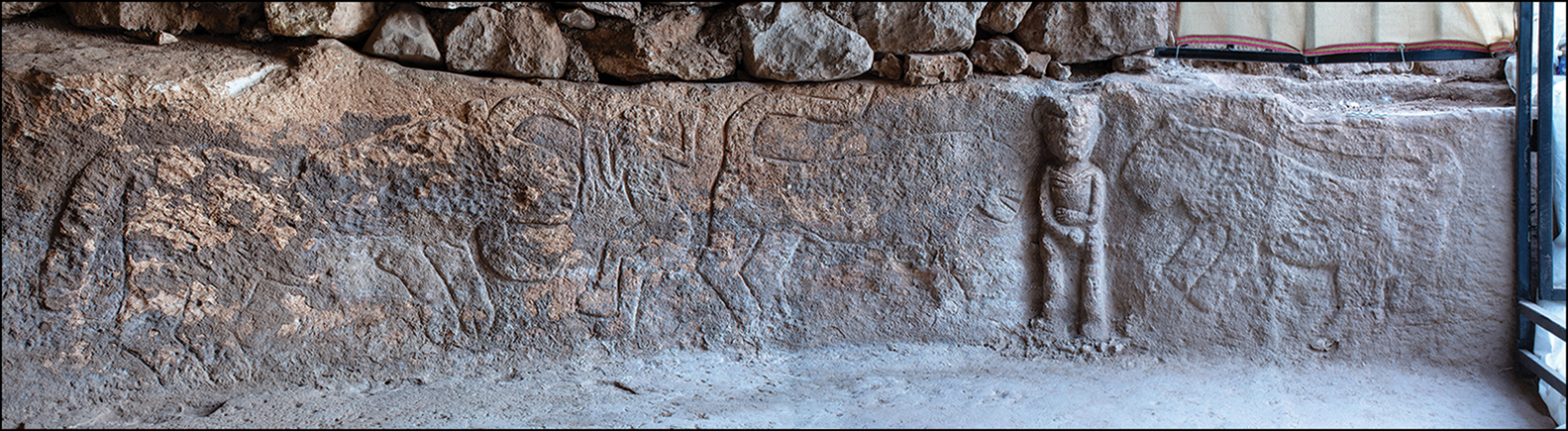
- Relief at Sayburç

- Location in Turkey
- 37°06′40.46″N 38°37′14.51″E
- Type: Settlement
- Periods: Pre-Pottery Neolithic A to B
- Location: Şanlıurfa Province, Turkey

History
- Built: c. 9000 BCE

Site notes
- Discovered: 2021

Sayburç is a Pre-Pottery Neolithic A (9th millennium BCE) archaeological site in Şanlıurfa, Turkey. The site is in the same geographical region as Göbekli Tepe. The relief is original in that it seems to depict a narrative scene with multiple actors, whereas other known sites depict figures individually.

== Site ==
The site is part of the Göbekli tepe Culture. It is part of a region of similar sites now being uncovered known as the Taş Tepeler.

Five figures appear in the 3.7 meters long relief, one central figure in high relief and the others in flat relief. The central human figure holds his penis in his right hand. He seems to be in a seated position, with his knees slightly bent. He has a round face, large ears, bulging eyes and thick lips. His torso displays a triangular-shaped necklace or neckband. Around him are leopards.

Another human figure in flat relief appears near him, facing a bull and seemingly holding a snake or a rattle in his hand.

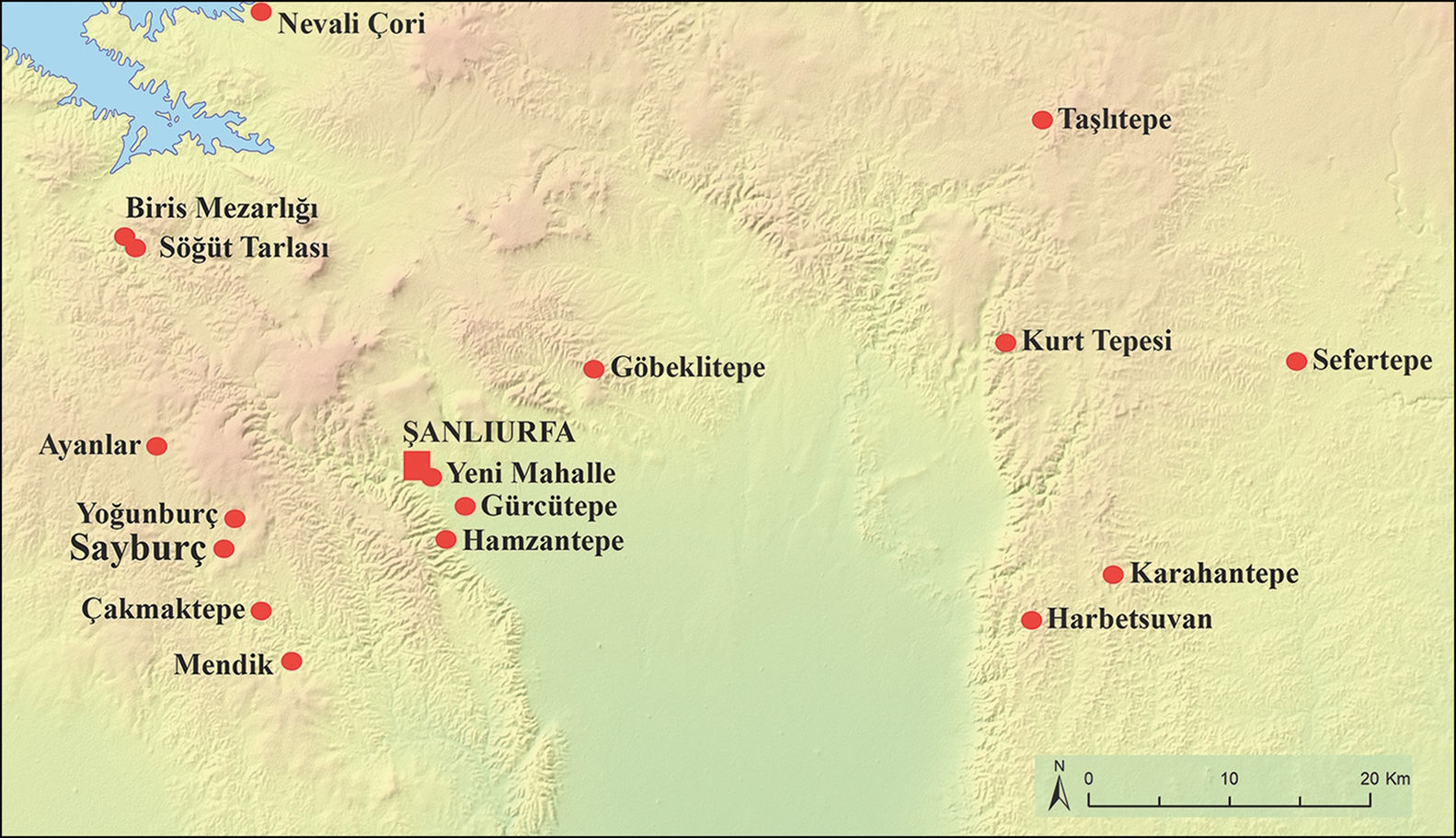
Relative location of Sayburç

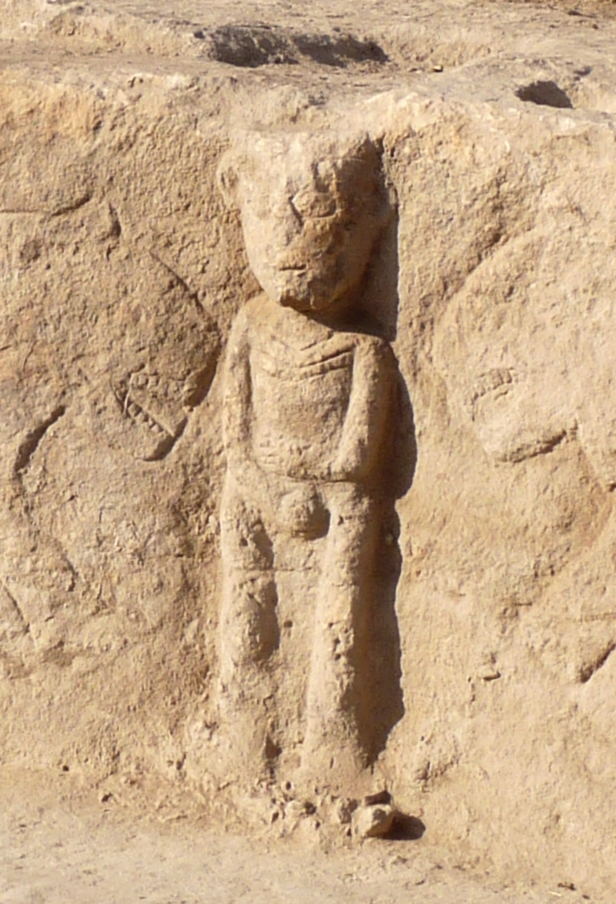
Central figure, with V-shaped collar clearly visible

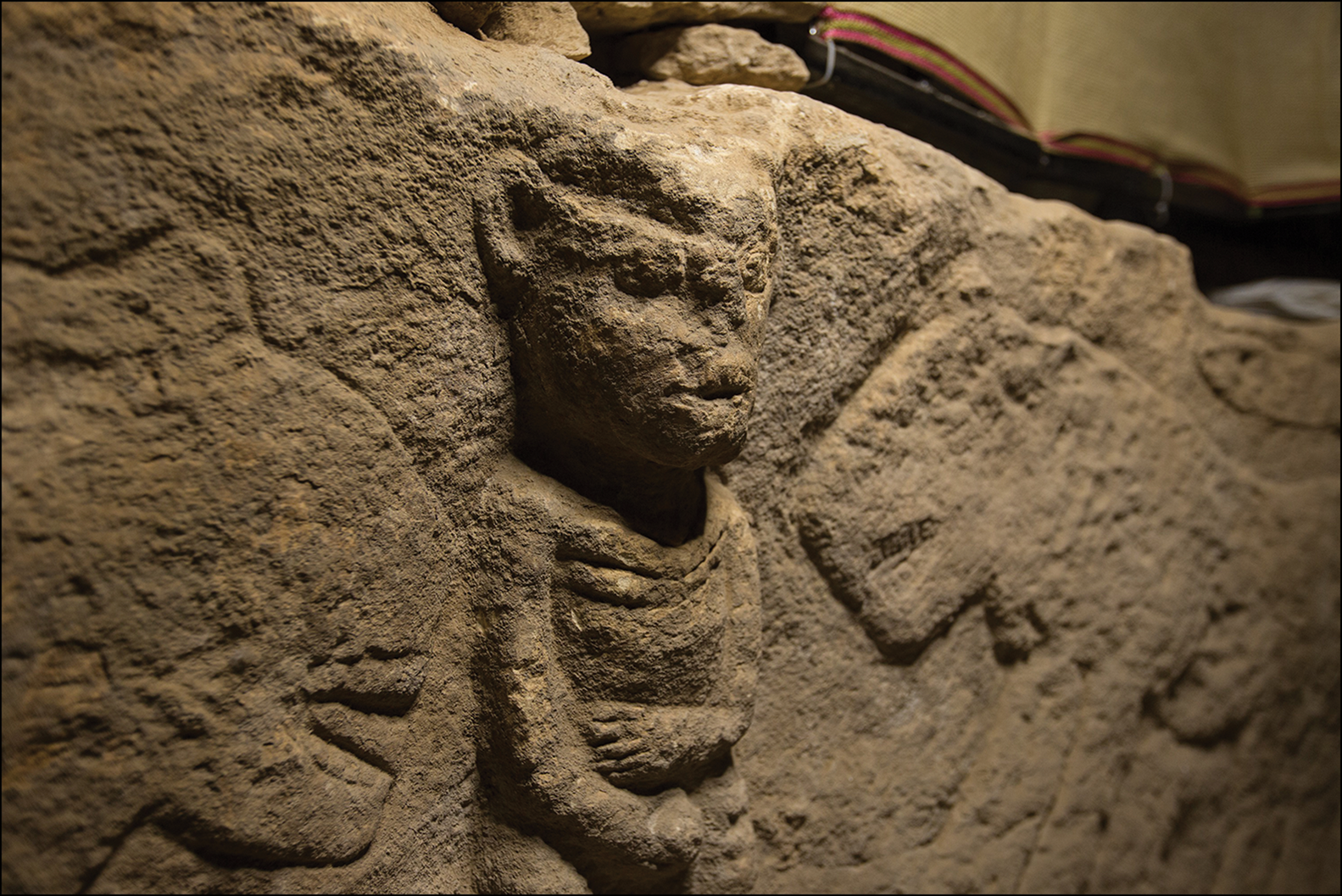
Central relief (right side)

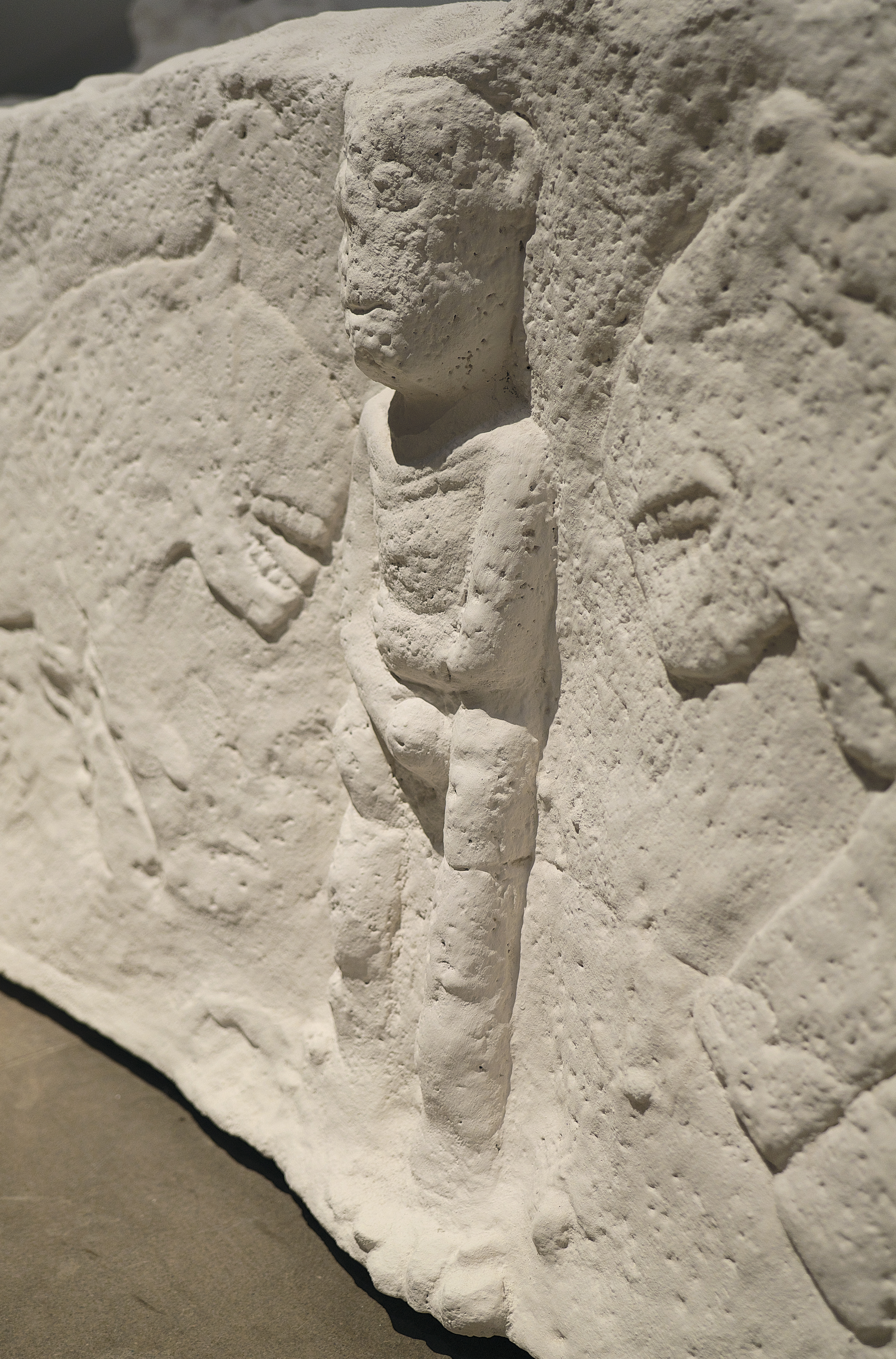
Central relief (left side, replica)
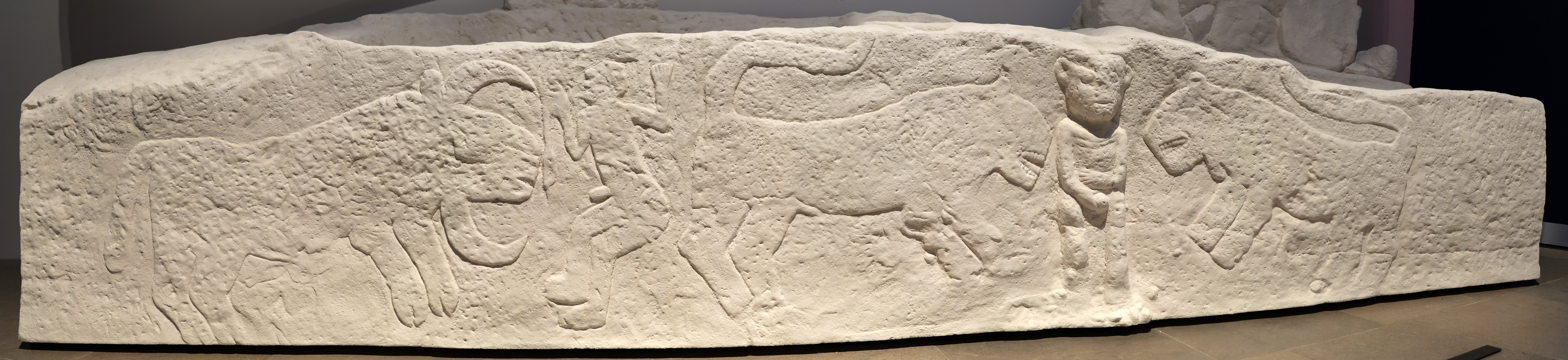
Replica of the relief scenes in an exhibition of the James Simon Gallery (Berlin)

== See also ==
- Boncuklu Tarla
- Gürcütepe – Archaeological site in Turkey
- List of largest monoliths
- Prehistoric religion – Religion before written records
