= Giant jars of Assam =

Archaeological artifacts found in India

The Giant jars of Assam, is the name given to the several hundred large stone jars which have been unearthed across four sites in Assam, India, covering a 300 square kilometres (120 sq mi) swath of the state. They range from 1 to 3 metres (3 ft 3 in to 9 ft 10 in) tall. Researchers believe they may have been used for ancient human burial practices.

== See also ==
- Stone vessel
- Plain of Jars
