= Ayanlar Höyük =

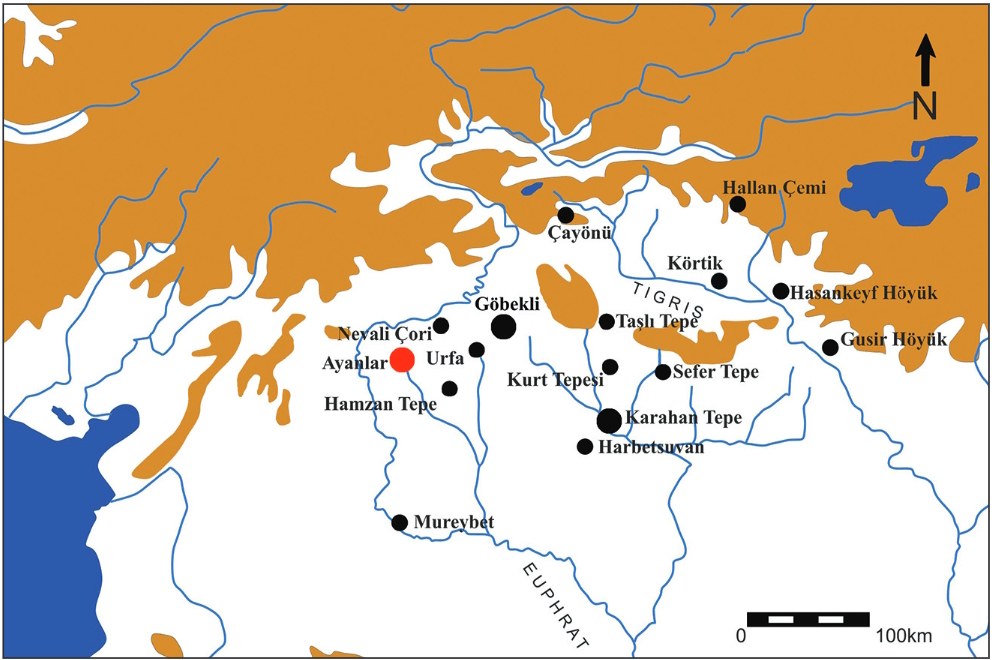
Ayanlar Höyük and other Neolithic centers located in the region.

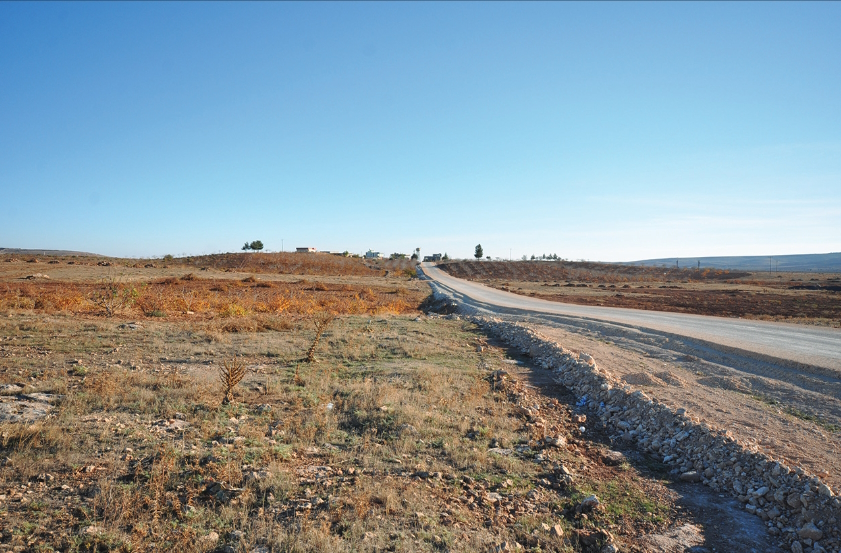
View of Ayanlar Höyük from the North

Ayanlar Höyük is an archaeological site in the Southeastern Anatolia of Turkey. It is the remains of a settlement occupied during the early to mid Pre-Pottery Neolithic B period. Located 30km west of Urfa, it was discovered in 2013. It is a large mound like Göbekli Tepe and Karahan Tepe. The site visibly belongs to the Taş Tepeler culture, but remains to be excavated.

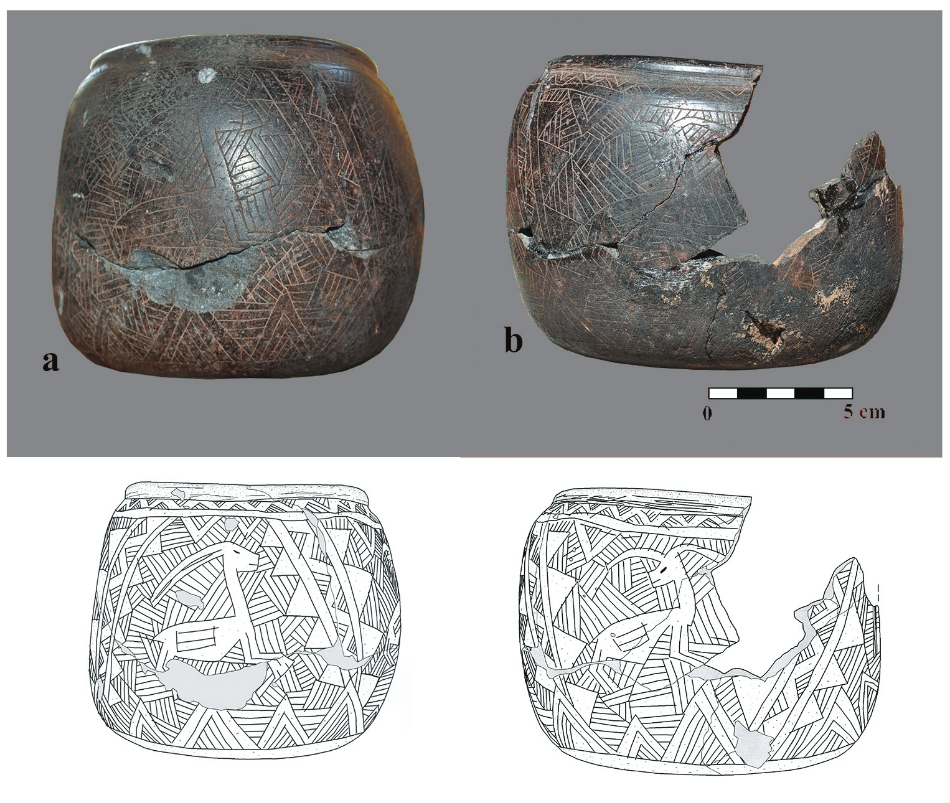
Stone vessels decorated with animal motif, Ayanlar Höyük (8800-7000 BCE)

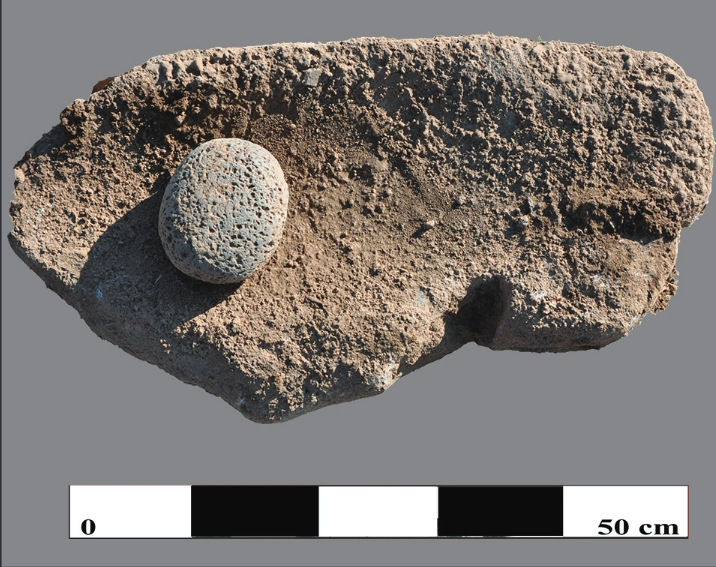
Top and bottom grindstones from Ayanlar Höyük

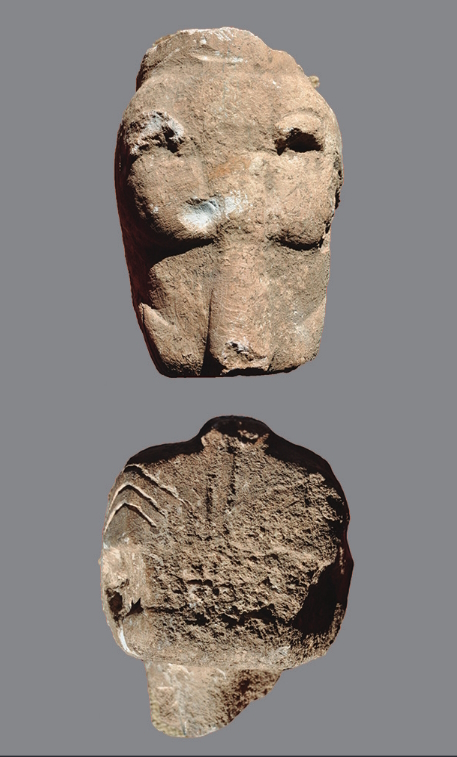
Fragment of sculpture depicting the head of a leopard from Ayanlar Höyük

== Sources ==
- Celik, Bahattin (27 December 2017). "A new Pre-Pottery Neolithic site in Southeastern Turkey: Ayanlar Höyük (Gre Hut)". Documenta Praehistorica. 44: 360–367. doi:10.4312/dp.44.22. ISSN 1854-2492.
