= PPN =

PPN may refer to:

- Guillermo León Valencia Airport
- Pre-Pottery Neolithic
- Nigerien Progressive Party-African Democratic Rally (Parti Progressiste Nigérien)
- Pingat Pangkuan Negara, a Malaysian honour
- Pedunculopontine nucleus
- Principal protected note, an investment contract
- Protoplanetary nebula
- Parameterized post-Newtonian formalism, for calculations on gravity
- Pacific Patriot Network
- PPN^{+} or [(Ph_{3}P)_{2}N]^{+} cation, produced from Bis(triphenylphosphine)iminium chloride
