= Dynamic asset allocation =

Investment strategy

Dynamic asset allocation is a strategy used by investment products such as hedge funds, mutual funds, credit derivatives, index funds, principal protected notes (also known as guaranteed linked notes) and other structured investment products to achieve exposure to various investment opportunities and provide 100% principal protection.

== Overview ==
Dynamic asset allocation includes CPPI, which consists of a guarantee, notionally related to a zero-coupon bond and an underlying investment. Assets are dynamically shifted (or allocated) between these two components depending largely on the performance of the underlying investments.

In some cases, certain products can use a borrowing facility to enhance exposure if the underlying investments experience strong returns. If the underlying investments decline in value, CPPI automatically deleverages, reducing exposure in falling markets.

The term 'Dynamic Asset Allocation' (DAA) can also refer to an investment strategy that seeks to produce high total returns irrespective of the performance of market indices using the tools of Tactical asset allocation/Global tactical asset allocation (TAA/GTAA) around a strategic benchmark. Indeed, many investment firms and commentators use the terms TAA, DAA, and GTAA interchangeably.

In the arena of institutional asset management DAA mandates tend to have absolute return targets that are not related to market index returns (e.g. USD LIBOR + 500bps), while TAA mandates will tend to have performance targets that reference market indices (e.g. 50% S&P 500/ 50% Barclays Capital Aggregate Bond Index + 200bps).

== See also ==
- Tactical asset allocation
- Global tactical asset allocation
- Constant proportion portfolio insurance
- Credit derivative
- Principal protected note
- Structured investment products
- Zero-coupon bond
