= Core & Satellite =

Investment strategy

Core & Satellite Portfolio Management is an investment strategy that incorporates traditional fixed-income and equity-based securities (i.e., index funds, exchange-traded funds (ETFs), passive mutual funds, etc.), known as the "core" portion of the portfolio, with a percentage of selected individual securities in the fixed-income and equity-based side of the portfolio known as the "satellite" portion.

== Core portfolio ==
The "core" is made of passively managed securities and uses a traditional benchmark (e.g., Russell 3000 or the S&P 1500) to benchmark performance. The positions may have more small cap stocks over mid/large cap companies, more value positions over growth positions, higher or lower concentration in developed international markets, and is sometimes consistent with the MONECO Seven Asset Allocation Management Theme. The market downturn of 2008 has many experts in the investments industry questioning the validity of asset allocation as a means for diversifying and managing overall risks associated with investing in stocks. As a consequence, other alternatives are now gaining force.

== Satellite portfolio ==
The "satellite" portion comprises holdings that the advisor expects will add alpha, the financial term for returns exceeding systematic. Holdings may include a style that is counter to the style bias of the core.

If the entire allotment of the satellite portion is not deemed worthy of inclusion, that portion will either be reallocated across "core" positions or in a "satellite holder", that is quickly traded without causing major tax implications (e.g., issues with FIFO based trades).

This satellite allocation may be implemented into 100% equity allocations and/or allocations that blend with fixed-income or non-equity positions. The satellite portfolio may be used for fixed-income investing or dedicated to equities and other financial assets. Principal protected notes may also be used.

Investments must be selected and managed considering the portfolio as a whole.

== Theory ==
In some efficient markets, active management has lower returns than passive management.
