= Al Baqa =

Palestinian village occupied by Israel

Coordinates: 31°32′04″N 35°07′28″E

Al Baqa or Al Baqa'a, also spelled Al-Beqa or Al baqr, (meaning "The open valley") is a Palestinian village located just east of Hebron. It has been occupied by Israel since 1967, together with the rest of the West Bank. It is sandwiched between the Israeli settlements Givat Harsina and Kiryat Arba. Wadi al-Ghrous or Wadi al Gruz is a locality of Hebron that borders Al Baqa on the west.

A Bedouin village with the name Al Baqa'a also exists some 11 kilometers southeast from Ramallah.

== Geography ==
Al Baqa is located in the heart of the Baqa'a Valley, a few kilometers east of Hebron City. It is sandwiched between the Israeli settlements Givat Harsina and Kiryat Arba. About half a kilometer west of the village lies the small locality Wadi al-Ghrous, separated by the bypass road 3507, which cuts across the village and connects the two settlements. Also a military outpost is located in between, adjacent to Road 3507. To the north, Al Baqa borders Al Bowereh, separated by Givat Harsina. East of the village lie Sa'ir and Bani Na'im, separated by the Israeli bypass road Highway 60. Al Baqa is a rural area.

== Population ==
According to the 2007 Census, the total population of Al Baqa in 2007 was about 1,200. In 2011, the PCBS estimated the population at 1,369 people. The populations of Al Baqa are mainly comprised from six families which are: Jaber family, Sultan family, Qamery family, Talhamey family, Al Natsha family and Da'na family. Wadi al-Ghrous had some 65 families in 2005.

== Israeli occupation ==
Al Baqa and its neighbour Wadi al-Ghrous are heavily afflicted by the Israeli occupation. They are isolated from the rest of the West Bank by settlements, bypass roads, road blocks and separation barriers. A significant part of their land is expropriated for the building of settlements and bypass roads. The settlers seek to take more Palestinian lands to integrate Givat Harsina and Kiryat Arba and form one big settlement bloc.

=== Farming land and water resources ===
Palestinian residents and observers repeatedly reported attacks, demolitions and confiscations by settlers and military. On 29 October 2009, for example, settlers and Israeli Civil Administration employees leveled agricultural lands of Al Baqa'a, confiscated irrigation networks pipes, destroyed all the stone barriers and an irrigation pool. In the week prior to this attack, soldiers and settlers reportedly attacked Palestinian farmers in an attempt to prevent them from growing plants which are the main source of income for these people. On 21 May 2012, Israeli forces, police and Mekorot workers destroyed crops and confiscated irrigation equipment. More than 13 dunums of agricultural land was destroyed.

On 2 March 2011, Israeli troops destroyed three Palestinian water wells, one in Al Baqa and two in Wadi al-Ghrous. According to Israel they were built without the requisite permits. On 22 October 2012, again a water well in Wadi al-Ghrous was destroyed

== Bibliography ==
- Palmer, E. H. (1881). The Survey of Western Palestine: Arabic and English Name Lists Collected During the Survey by Lieutenants Conder and Kitchener, R. E. Transliterated and Explained by E.H. Palmer. Committee of the Palestine Exploration Fund.
