= GTAA =

GTAA may refer to:

- Grand Theft Auto Advance, an alternate name to the Grand Theft Auto game for the Game Boy Advance
- Georgia Tech Athletic Association, a non-profit organization
- Global Tactical Asset Allocation, a top-down investment strategy
- Greater Toronto Airports Authority, an airport operator
