= Grégoire Pennone =

American business executive

- Born: 1975 (age 50–51); Geneva, Switzerland
- Citizenship: Swiss
- Education: University of Geneva (BS); University of Geneva (MBA); New York University
- Alma mater: University of Geneva
- Occupations: Business Executive, Private Banker
- Known for: Major Shareholder and CEO of One Swiss Bank

Grégoire Pennone (born 1975) is a Swiss business executive and private banker who is currently a major shareholder in, and the chief executive officer of ONE Swiss Bank.

== Education ==
Pennone received his Bachelor's Degree in Law from the University of Geneva in 1998, he then attended the NYU School of Continuing Education in 1999 and returned to the University of Geneva in 2007 to obtain an MBA.

== Business career ==
Grégoire Pennone succeeded his father Robert, who co-founded One Swiss Bank, in early 2015 as CEO. Pennone's new position as CEO came about after he briefly left Banque Bénédict Hentsch & Cie, where he had served as an executive. He returned to the newly formed GS Banque, later to become One Swiss Bank, in order to take control of the firm's day-to-day operations.

Under Pennone's guidance One Swiss Bank has taken an increasingly entrepreneurial stance when it comes to wealth management in the private banking sector. Pennone was personally in charge of the many mergers the bank underwent (such as the Banca Arner and Banque Profil de Gestion mergers) in order to form the current ONE swiss bank.

== Other Roles ==
Grégoire serves on the board of and acts as an advisor to a number of other firms, outside of ONE swiss bank. He was a board member of Laclinic Montreux. Today, he occupies the role of Director at Oxial and Corporate Governance Advisor at M&BD Consulting.

Grégoire is also a seasoned event organiser. He founded the Geneva Marathon in 2003, with its first edition in 2005, and was president of the organising committee until 2010.

== Recognition ==
The Swiss finance magazine Bilan named Grégoire and his father Robert "The Expert and The Manager," in a 2019 article on the rapid growth and expansion GS Banque experienced under the duo.

Business positions
Preceded by Robert Pennone	CEO of One Swiss Bank; 2015– Present
