= One Swiss Bank =

Private bank and finance firm in Switzerland

ONE Swiss Bank SA
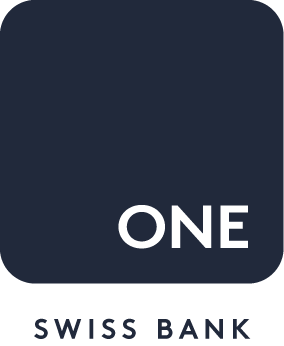
- Type: Private
- Industry: Financial services
- Predecessor: Banque Bénédict Hentsch & Cie; Banca Arner; Société Bancaire Privée; Banque Profil de Gestion; GS Banque
- Founded: 1964; 62 years ago
- Founder: Bénédict Hentsch, Robert Pennone, Giovanni Giacomo Schräemli and Paolo del Bue
- Headquarters: Geneva, Switzerland
- Number of locations: 4: Geneva, Zurich, Lugano, Dubai
- Area served: Worldwide
- Key people: Grégoire Pennone (CEO), Frédéric Binder (Chairman)
- Products: Private banking Asset management Alternative investments
- AUM: ▲CHF 5 billion
- Number of employees: ▲80 (2023)
- Subsidiaries: One Swiss Private Wealth Ltd
- Capital ratio: ▲18.6%
- Website: www.oneswissbank.com

ONE Swiss Bank SA is a Swiss publicly traded private bank and wealth management firm based in Geneva. One Swiss Bank specializes in private banking and tailored asset & wealth management. It provides its services to private and institutional clients across Switzerland and the world.

The bank was founded in 2004 by Bénédict Hentsch. Hentsch's bank changed its name to GS Banque in 2014 and merged with Banque Profil de Gestion and Banca Arner, forming One Swiss Bank in 2021. As of 2023, the firm had CHF 5 billion of assets under management.

== History ==
One Swiss Bank was born from the merger between GS Banque (Geneva Swiss Bank), founded in 2004 by Robert Pennone and Bénédict Hentsch, (then under the name Banque Bénédict Hentsch & Cie) and Banca Arner, founded in 1984 by Giovanni Giacomo Schräemli and Paolo del Bue. The Hentsch family are some of oldest and most renowned bankers in Switzerland and Europe, having founded Lombard Odier Darier Hentsch & Cie in 1798.

In June 2021, Banque Profil de Gestion, founded in 1964 in Geneva under the name Société Financière Privée and One Swiss Bank merged. They decided to continue operating under the name One Swiss Bank and renamed the resultant sub branch Dynagest.

One Swiss Bank opened its Dubai wealth management offices in the Fall of 2021, known as One Swiss Private Wealth. The board appointed Zafar Khan as the head of One Swiss Bank's Emirates division.

== The Hentsch Family ==
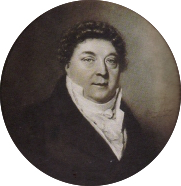
An 18th century portrait of the Stockbroker and Financier, Henri Hentsch.

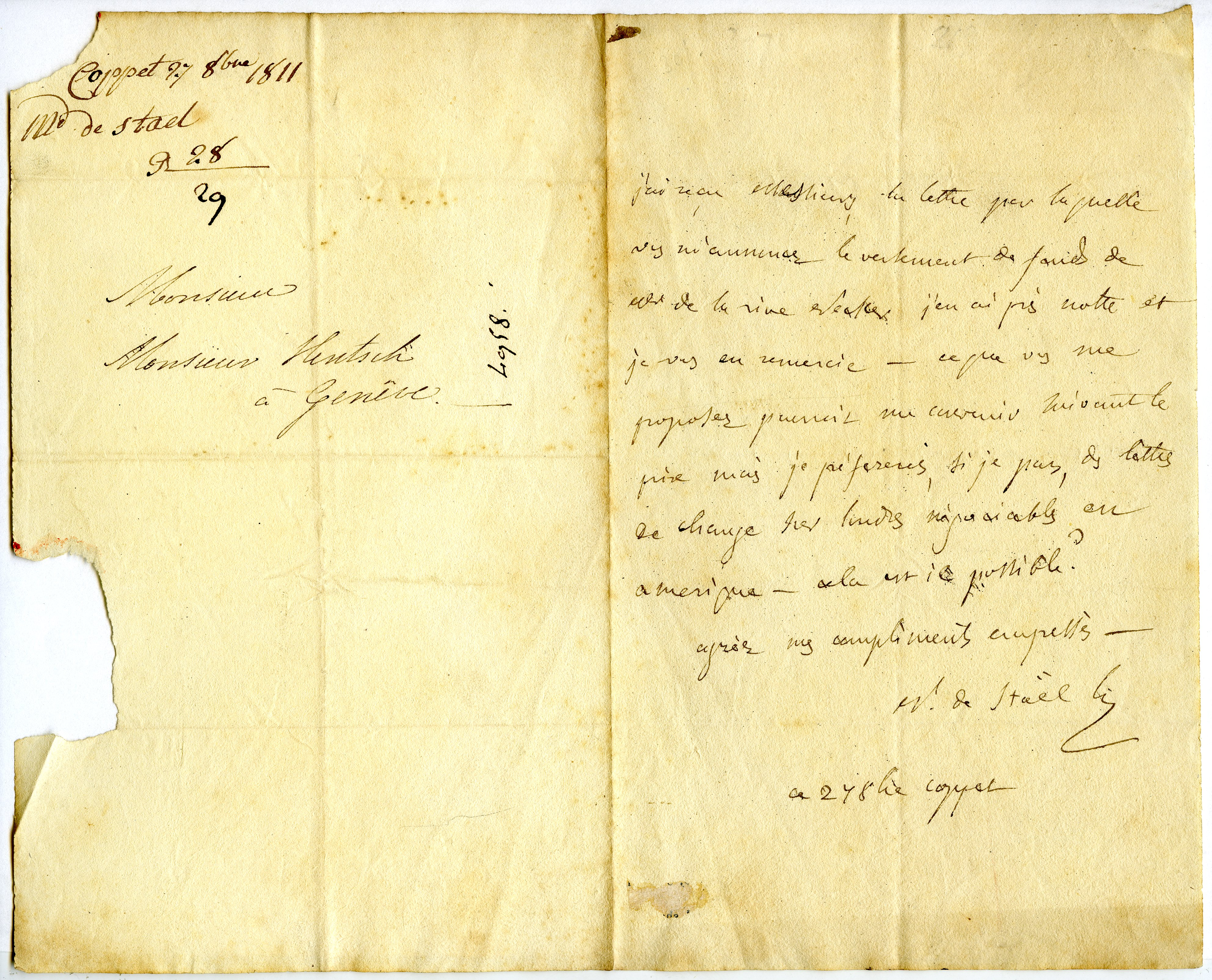
Madame de Staël's letter to Henri Hentsch, 1811.

One Swiss Bank was founded in 2004 by Bénédict Hentsch among others, who represents the seventh generation in a dynasty of one of Europe's most prominent banking families.

The Genevoise line of the Hentsch family emigrated to Switzerland in the 18th century from the Protestant and Culturally German part of Poland. The line can trace itself directly back to the stockbroker and financier Henri Hentsch.

In 1789, the finance trade in Geneva was heavily influenced by the onslaught of the French Revolution. In 1793, Henri Hentsch was detained by Genevan revolutionaries and exiled to Nyon, where he began a silk trading business with an associate, Edmé Mémo.

Despite experiencing profound economic difficulties and high unemployment, Henri Hentsch came back to Geneva to found H. Hentsch & Cie in 1796. The firm, known as a house of "Silk and Sales", traded silk in parallel with its banking activities. This would set the precedent for the founding of Lombard Odier & Co.

Henri Hentsch handled bills of exchange and letters of credit for foreigners. Some of his illustrious clients included Napoleon I and even Madame de Staël, daughter of Jacques Necker, the minister of Finance to Louis XVI.

In 1826, he founded a second establishment in Paris, leaving his son the company in Geneva.

== Dynagest by ONE ==
Dynagest is a company which belongs directly to One Swiss Bank. Dynagest by ONE's services consist mainly of managing investment funds with a primary focus on equities and bonds, to which alternative management funds are added.

The company is known for its quantitative management method called: Dynamic asset allocation (DAA). It currently stands at the forefront of algorithm investing in Switzerland. Dynagest is also a pioneer in the use and development of Ratchet Management techniques, in relation to interest rates. Ratchet Management (Time Invariance Portfolio Protection or TIPP) is considered a simplified approach to portfolio insurance.

== Compliance ==
One Swiss Bank is known for having a notable and extensive compliance department, which has allowed it to take on a new generation of clients, whose wealth is derived from cryptocurrencies. In 2023, The Corriere Del Ticino wrote an article on the rigor of the bank's compliance team, and its ability to take on niche clients as a result.

== Governance ==
The board of directors is responsible for the bank's strategic goals and management decisions. Its composition meets the independence criteria as specified in Circ.-FINMA 17/1. The members of the Board include Chairman Frédéric Binder, Vice-Chairman Jean-Claude Favre and ordinary board members: Alessandro Bizzozero, Roland Müller-Ineichen and Hélène Weidmann.

The Executive Team acts as the governing body of the Bank. It is composed of the CEO Grégoire Pennone, CFO/CRO Yves Keller and COO Jean-Jacques Schraemli. Aymeric Converset, Xavier Clavel and Karel Gaultier are also on the Executive Team.

== See also ==
- Private banking
- Banking in Switzerland
- Family office
