= Givat Harsina =

Israeli settlement

Coordinates: 31.53°N 35.12°E

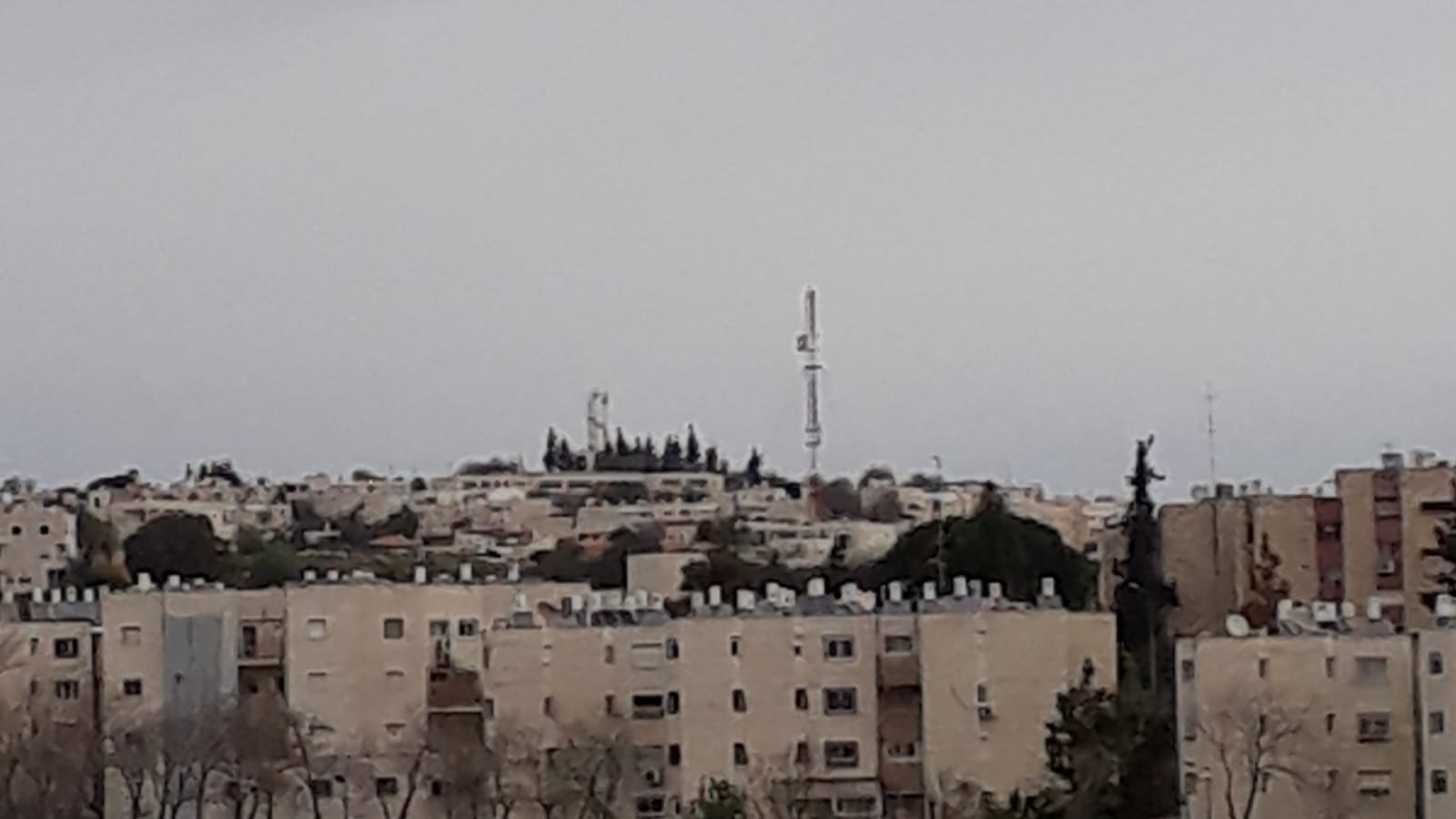
Givat Harsina in 2019

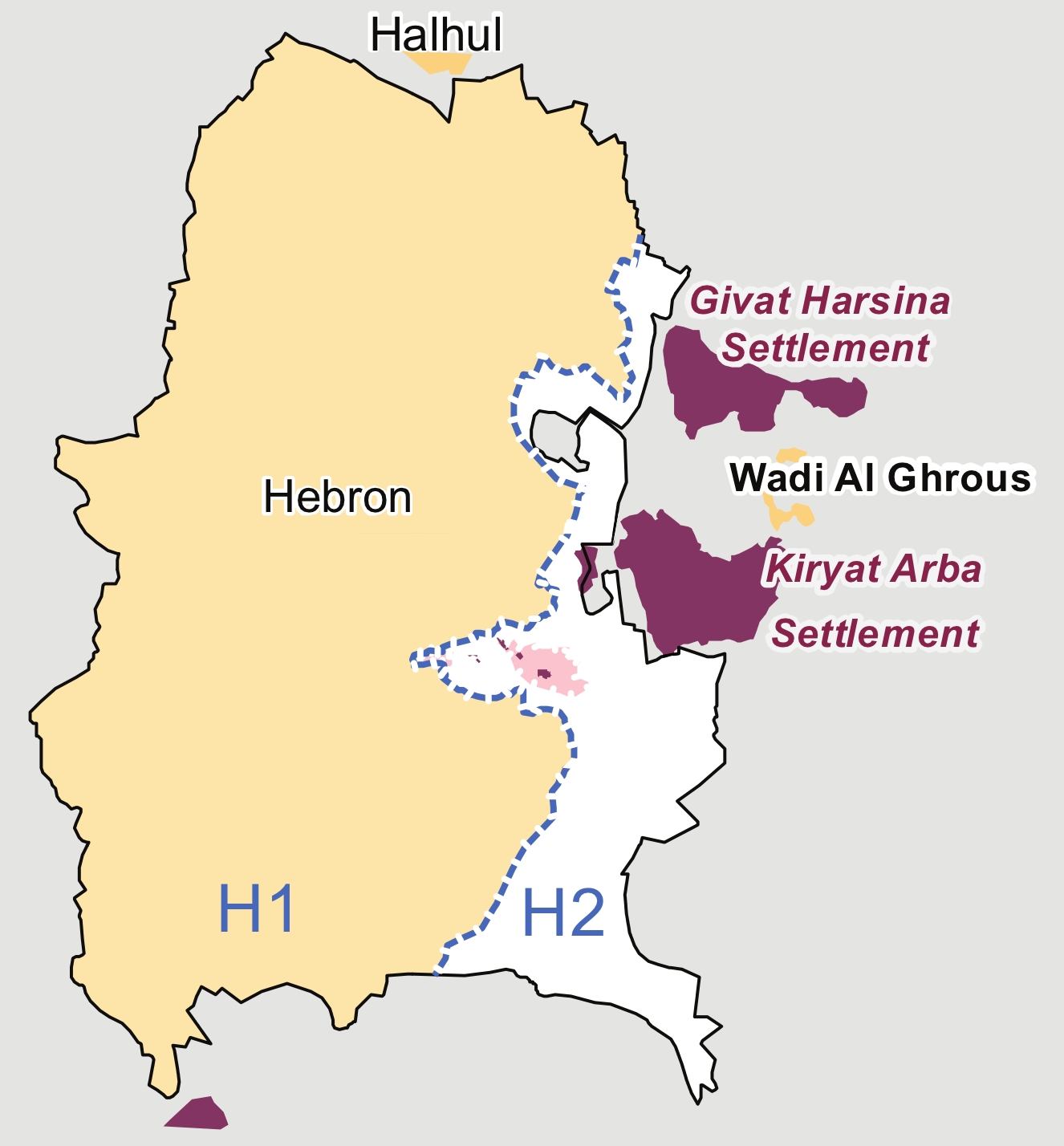
Givat Harsina shown to the northeast of Hebron

Givat Harsina (Arabic: جفعات هرسينا Hebrew: גִּבְעַת חַרְסִינָה), also Ramat Mamre (Hebrew: רָמַת מַמְרֵא), is an Israeli settlement on the outskirts of the Palestinian city of Hebron, in the Judean Mountains region of the West Bank. Israel officially considers it part of the settlement of Kiryat Arba, and its population statistics are included with those of Kiryat Arba.

The international community considers Israeli settlements in the West Bank illegal under international law, but the Israeli government disputes this.

== History ==
Givat Harsina was founded in 1979. The settlement was named after Colonel Aaron Harsina (Hebrew: אהרן חרסינה). It is also called Ramat Mamre because of its proximity to Mamre. Wadi al Ghrous is located in the heart of the Baqa'a Valley, a few kilometers east of Hebron City. It is sandwiched between the Israeli settlements Givat Harsina and Kiryat Arba.
