= Pre-Pottery Neolithic =

Earlier part of the Neolithic period in Southwest Asia

- The Fertile Crescent, c. 7500 BCE (PPNB), with main Pre-Pottery Neolithic sites (black squares for pre-agricultural sites). The area of Mesopotamia proper was not yet settled by humans.
- Geographical range: Fertile Crescent
- Period: Neolithic
- Dates: c. 10000 – 6500 BCE
- Type site: Jericho
- Preceded by: Epipalaeolithic Near East (Kebaran, Natufian, Zarzian, Khiamian cultures)
- Followed by: Pottery Neolithic: Yarmukian culture; Halaf culture; most of Neolithic Greece; Faiyum A culture

The Pre-Pottery Neolithic (PPN) represents the early Neolithic in the Near East, dating to c. 12,000 – c. 8,500 years ago, (10000 – 6500 BCE). It succeeds the Natufian culture of the Epipalaeolithic Near East (also called Mesolithic), as the domestication of plants and animals was in its formative stages, having possibly been induced by the Younger Dryas.

The Pre-Pottery Neolithic culture came to an end around the time of the 8.2-kiloyear event, a cool spell centred on 6200 BCE that lasted several hundred years. It is succeeded by the Pottery Neolithic.

== Chronology ==
Prehistoric Southwest Asia
Axis scale is years Before Present

=== Pre-Pottery Neolithic A (10000–8800 BCE) ===
The Pre-Pottery Neolithic is divided into Pre-Pottery Neolithic A (PPNA 10000–8800 BCE) and the following Pre-Pottery Neolithic B (PPNB 8800–6500 BCE). These were originally defined by Kathleen Kenyon in the type site of Jericho. The Pre-Pottery Neolithic precedes the ceramic Neolithic (Yarmukian culture, 6400 – 6200 BCE). At 'Ain Ghazal, in Jordan, the culture continued a few more centuries as the so-called Pre-Pottery Neolithic C culture.

One of the earliest known Pre-Pottery Neolithic sites is Körtik Tepe in Upper Mesopotamia, starting in the Younger Dryas period in 10,700 BCE. Around 9,000 BCE, during the Pre-Pottery Neolithic A (PPNA), the "world's first town", Jericho, appeared in the Levant, although the adequacy of this title has since been challenged.

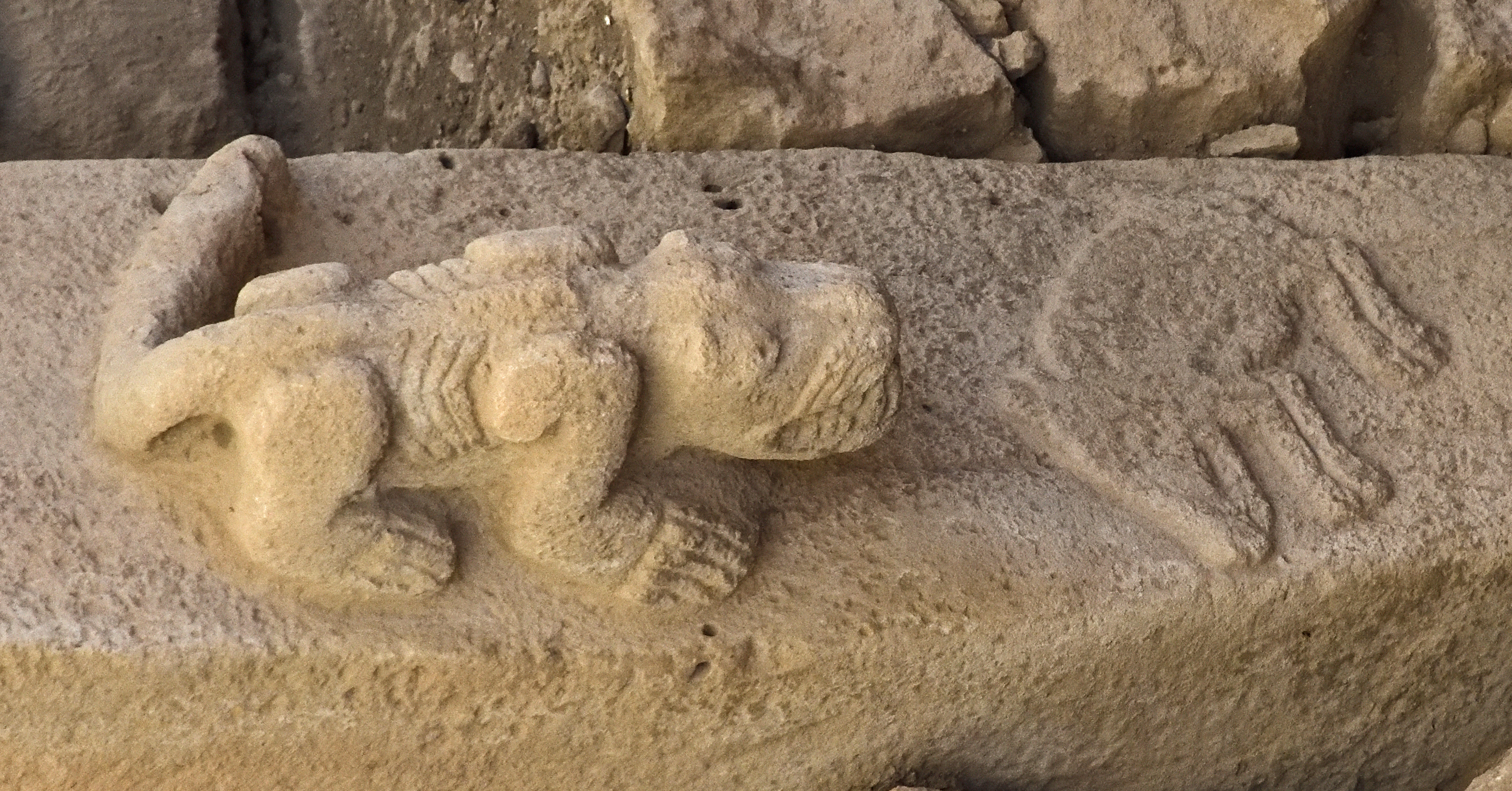
Sculpture of a predatory animal, Göbekli Tepe, circa 9000 BCE

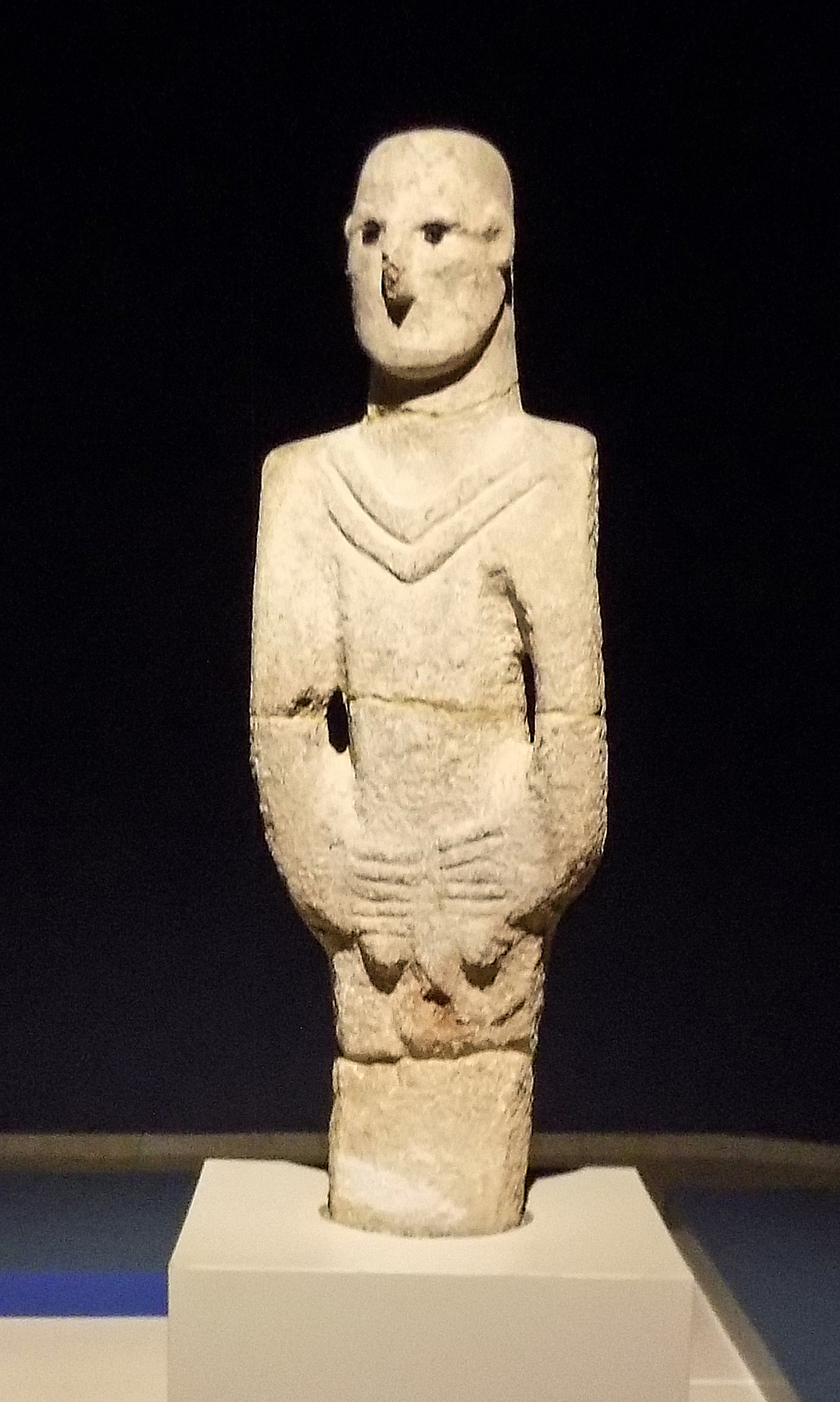
Urfa Man, c. 9000 BCE. Şanlıurfa Archaeology and Mosaic Museum.

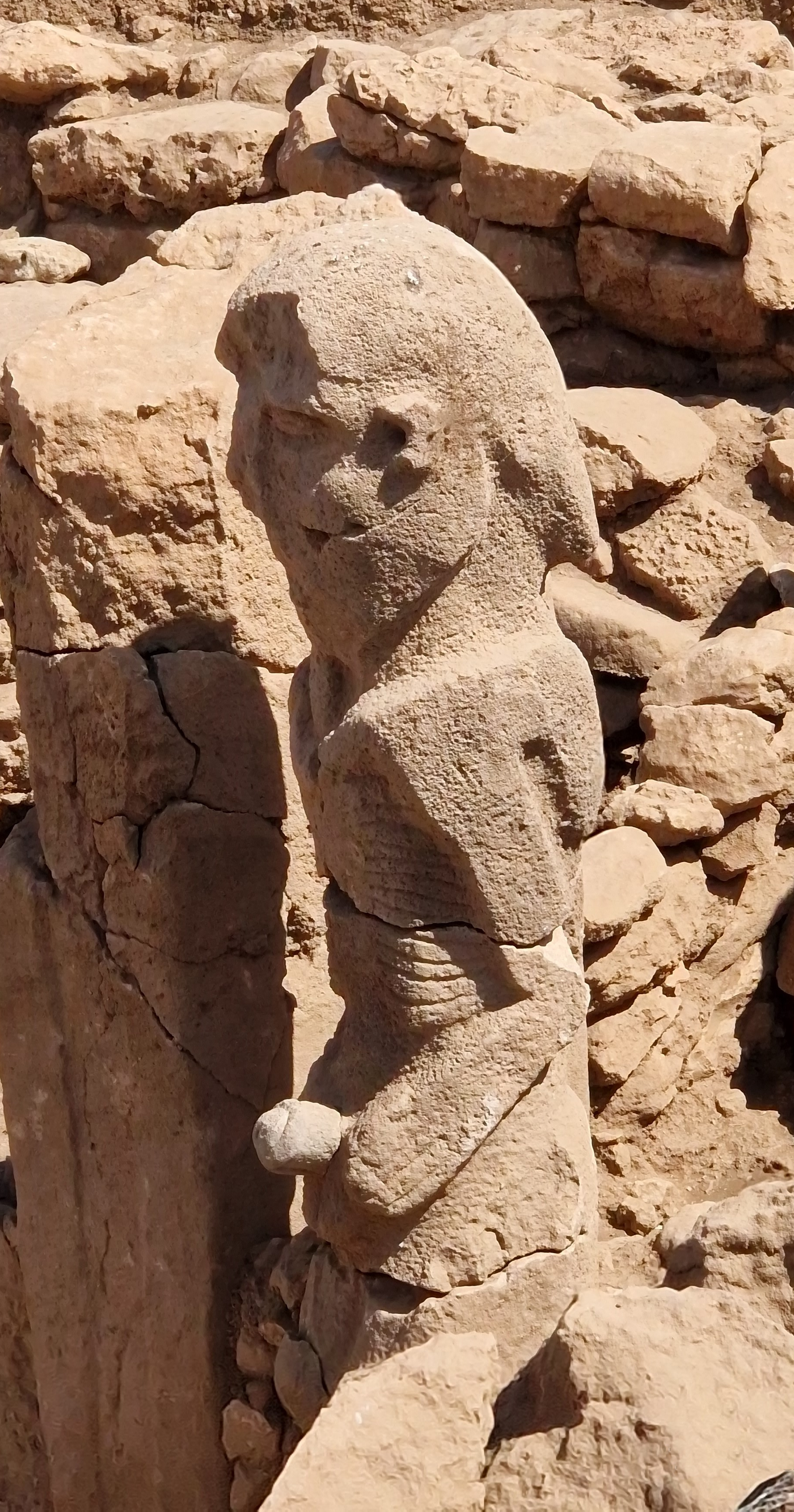
Karahan Tepe anthropomorphic statue (2.3 meters), naked and holding phallus with both hands.

=== Pre-Pottery Neolithic B (8800–6500 BCE) ===
Map of the world showing approximate centers of the Neolithic Revolution and spread of agriculture in prehistory: the Fertile Crescent (11,000 BP), the Yangtze and Yellow River basins (9,000 BP) and the New Guinea Highlands (9,000–6,000 BP), Central Mexico (5,000–4,000 BP), Northern South America (5,000–4,000 BP), sub-Saharan Africa (5,000–4,000 BP, exact location unknown), eastern North America (4,000–3,000 BP)

The Pre-Pottery Neolithic is divided into Pre-Pottery Neolithic A (10000 – 8800 BCE) and the following Pre-Pottery Neolithic B (8800 – 6500 BCE). PPNB differed from PPNA in showing greater use of domesticated animals, a different set of tools, and new architectural styles.

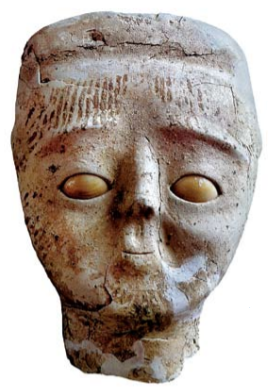
Head of a statue from Jericho, from c. 9000 years ago (7000 BCE). On display at the Rockefeller Museum, in Jerusalem.

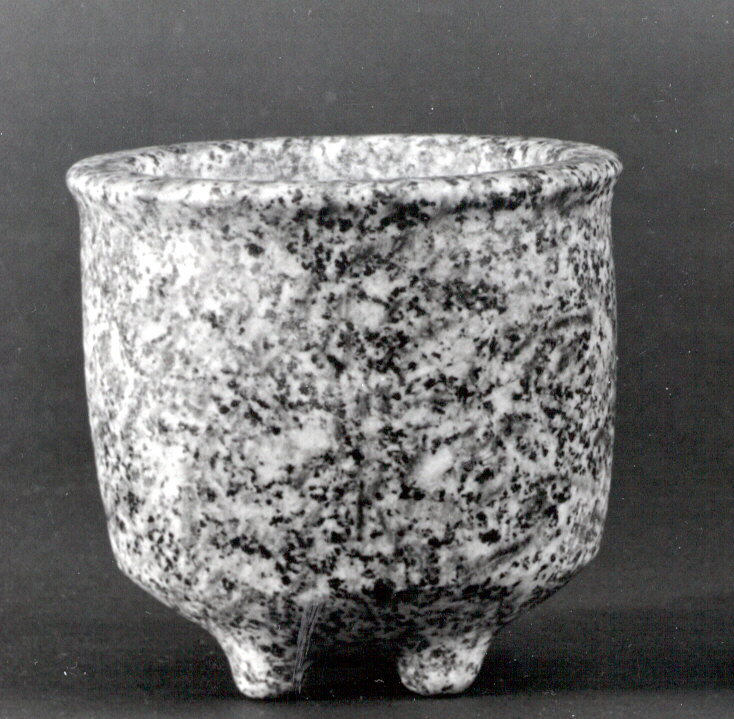
Footed bowl in granite, Syria, end of 8th Millennium BCE.

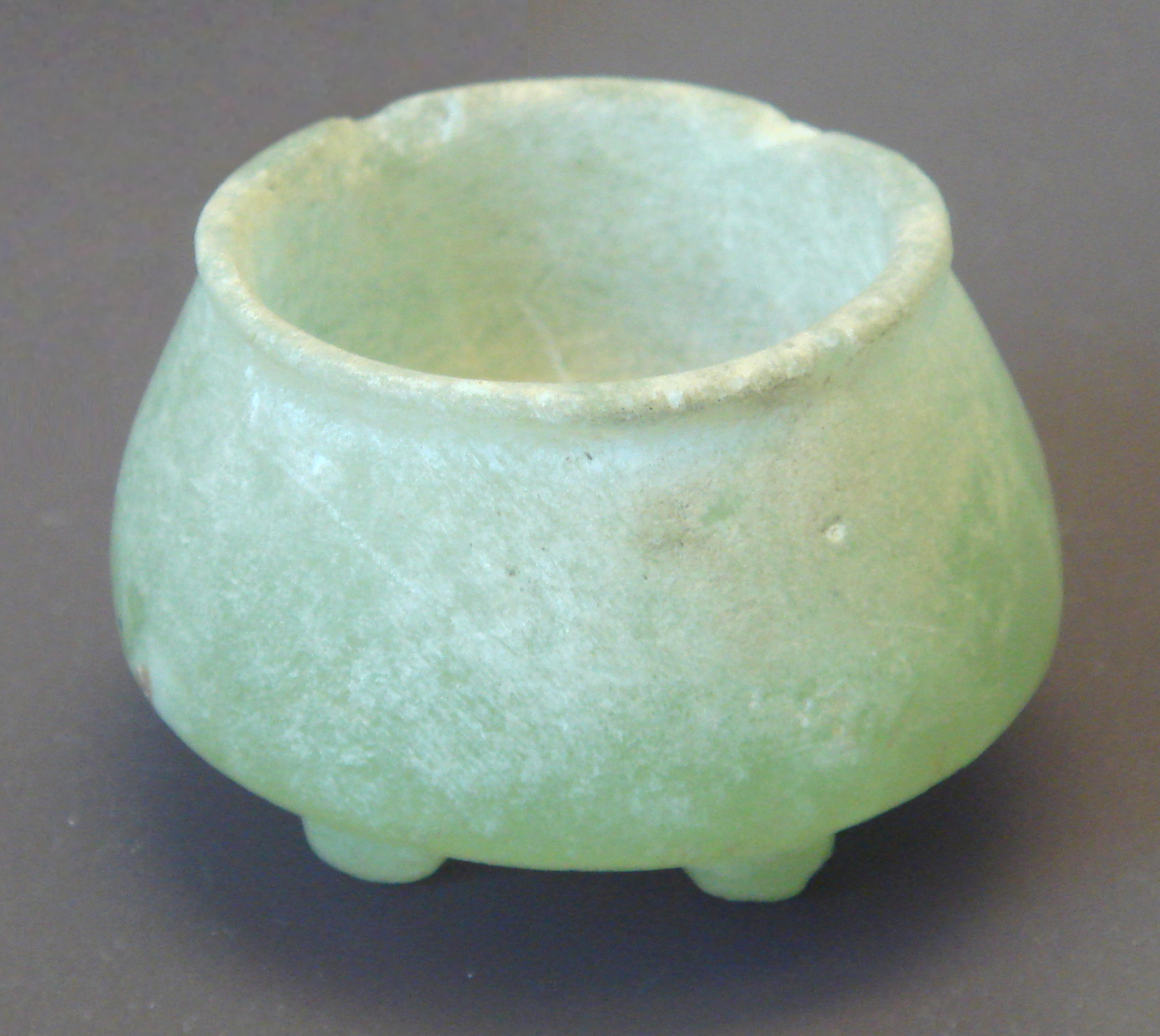
Green aragonite tripod vase Mid-Euphrates 6000 BCE Louvre Museum AO 28386

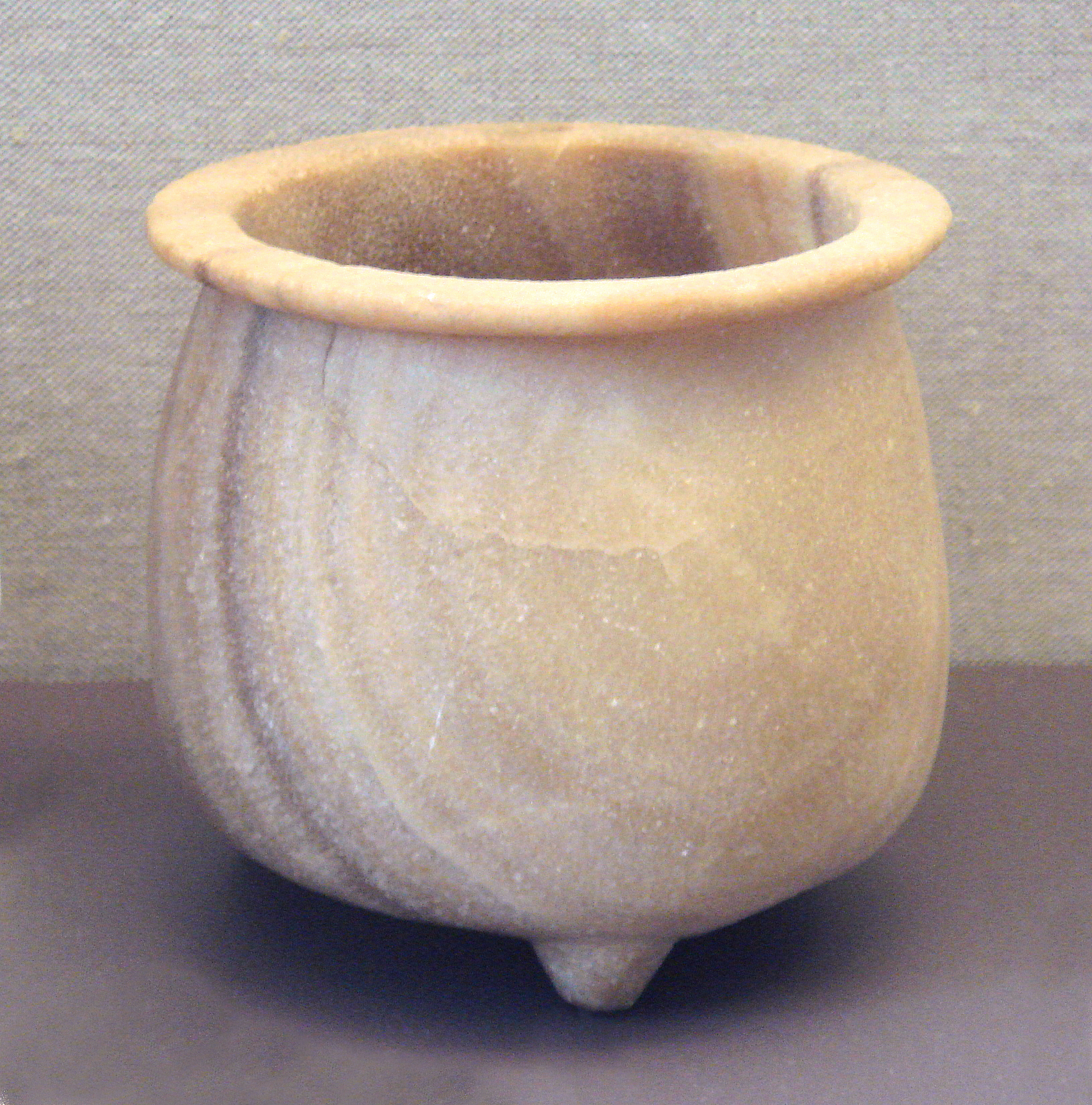
Calcite tripod vase, mid-Euphrates, probably from Tell Buqras, 6000 BCE, Louvre Museum AO 31551

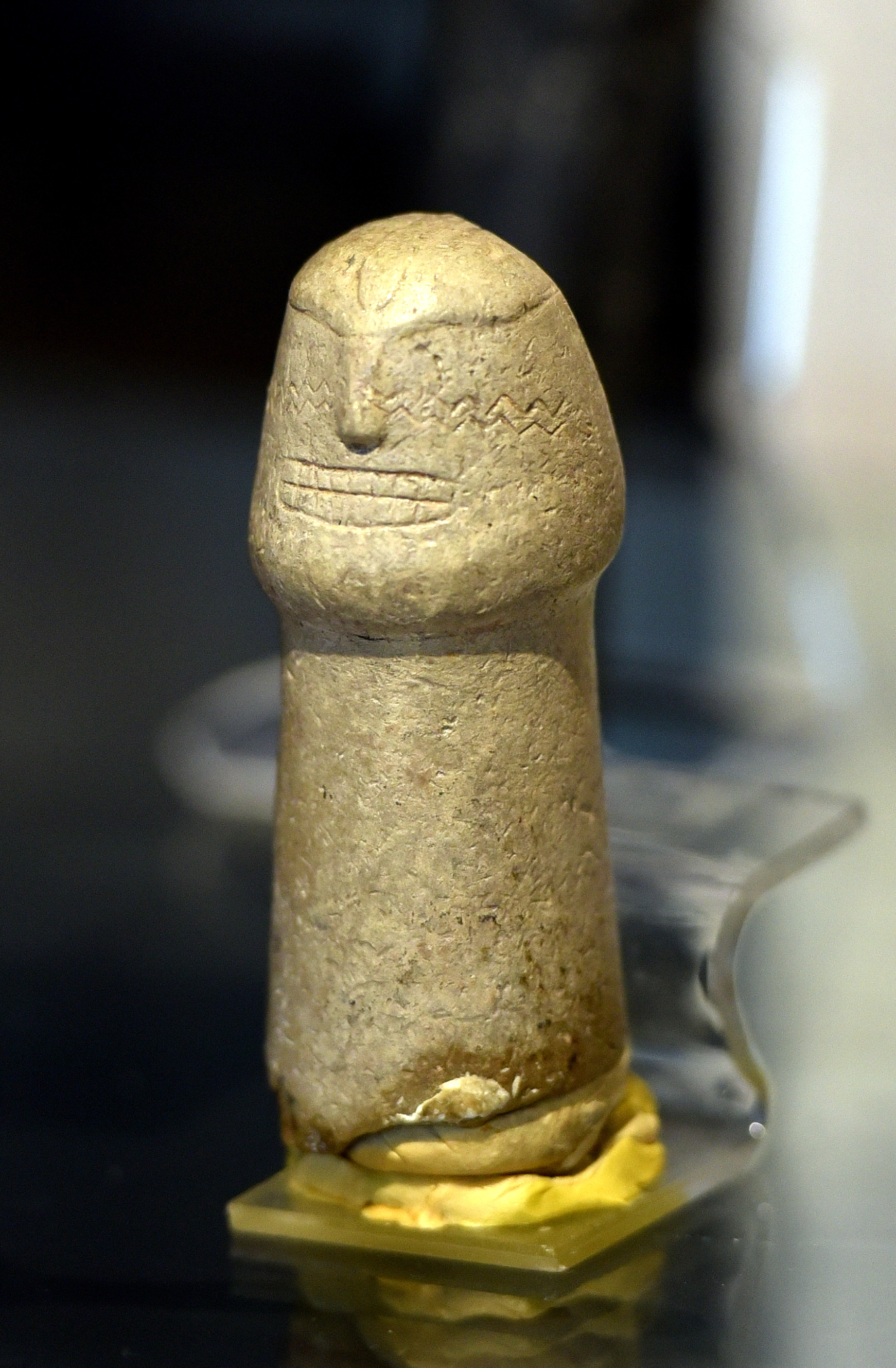
Phallic sculpture with engraved human figure. Nemrik (7800–6500 BC). National Museum of Iraq - Baghdad.

=== Pre-Pottery Neolithic C (circa 6500 BCE) ===
Work at the site of 'Ain Ghazal in Jordan has indicated a later Pre-Pottery Neolithic C period. Juris Zarins has proposed that a Circum Arabian Nomadic Pastoral Complex developed in the period from the climatic crisis of 6200 BCE, partly as a result of an increasing emphasis in PPNB cultures upon domesticated animals, and a fusion with Harifian hunter-gatherers in the Southern Levant, with affiliate connections with the cultures of Fayyum and the Eastern Desert of Egypt. Cultures practicing this lifestyle spread down the Red Sea shoreline and moved east from Syria into southern Iraq.

In Israel, PPNC sites are rather rare. By 2008, only four sites had been clearly identified: Ashkelon (Afridar) and 'Atlit Yam on the coast, stratum II at Tel 'Ali one mile south of the Sea of Galilee, and Ha-Gosherim in the north.

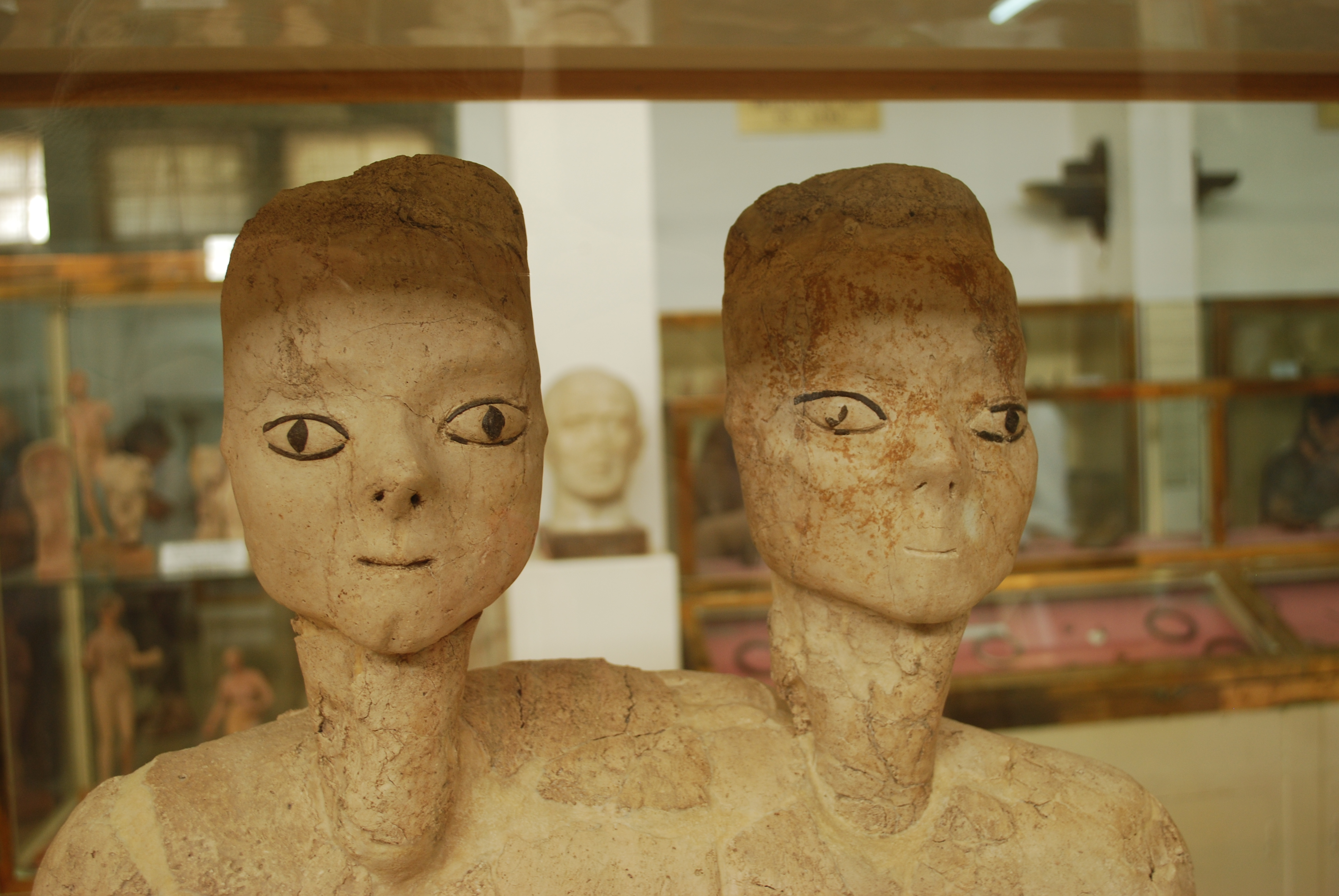
ʿAin Ghazal statues: closeup of one of the bicephalous statues, c. 6500 BCE.

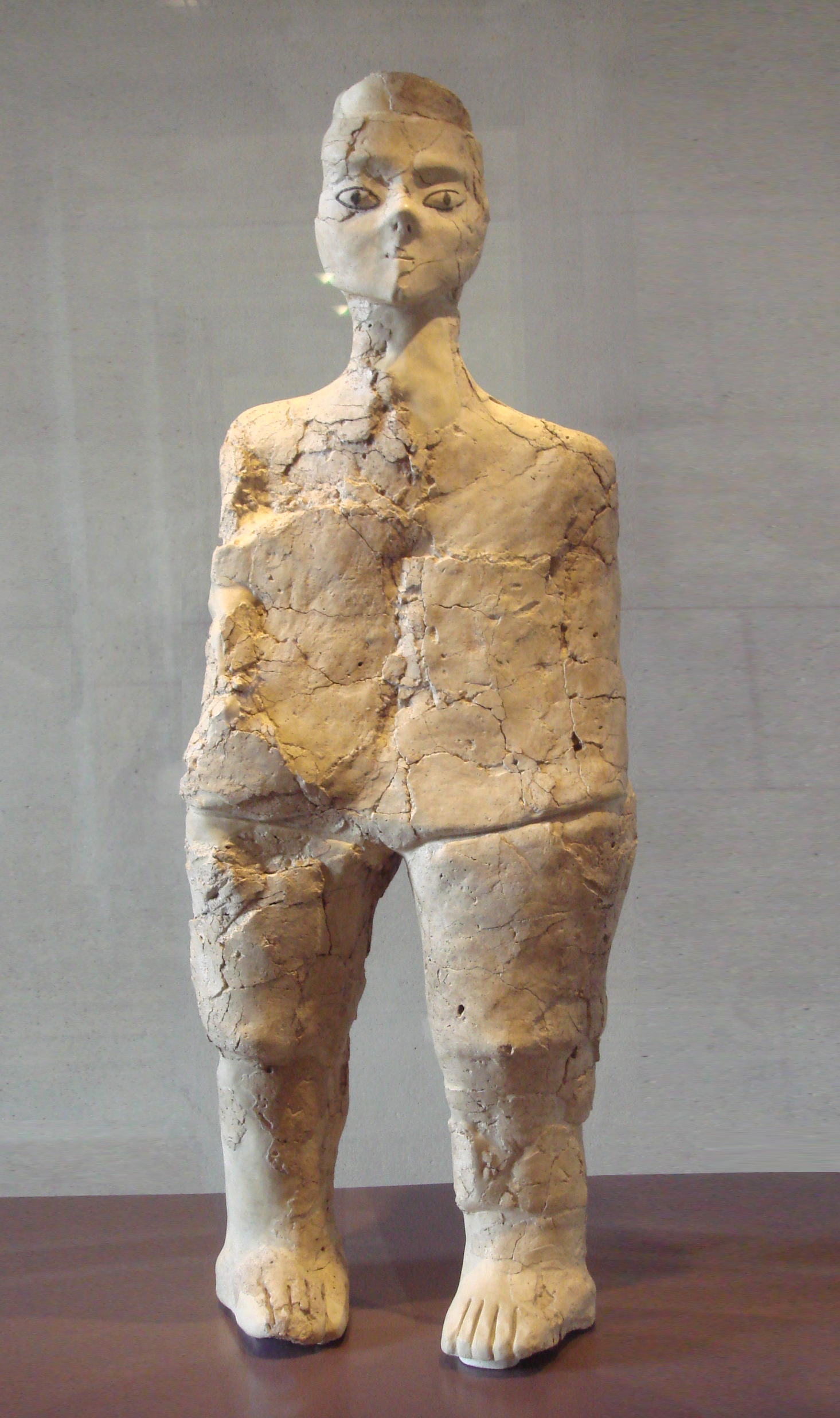
Ain Ghazal statue on show in the Musée du Louvre, Paris.

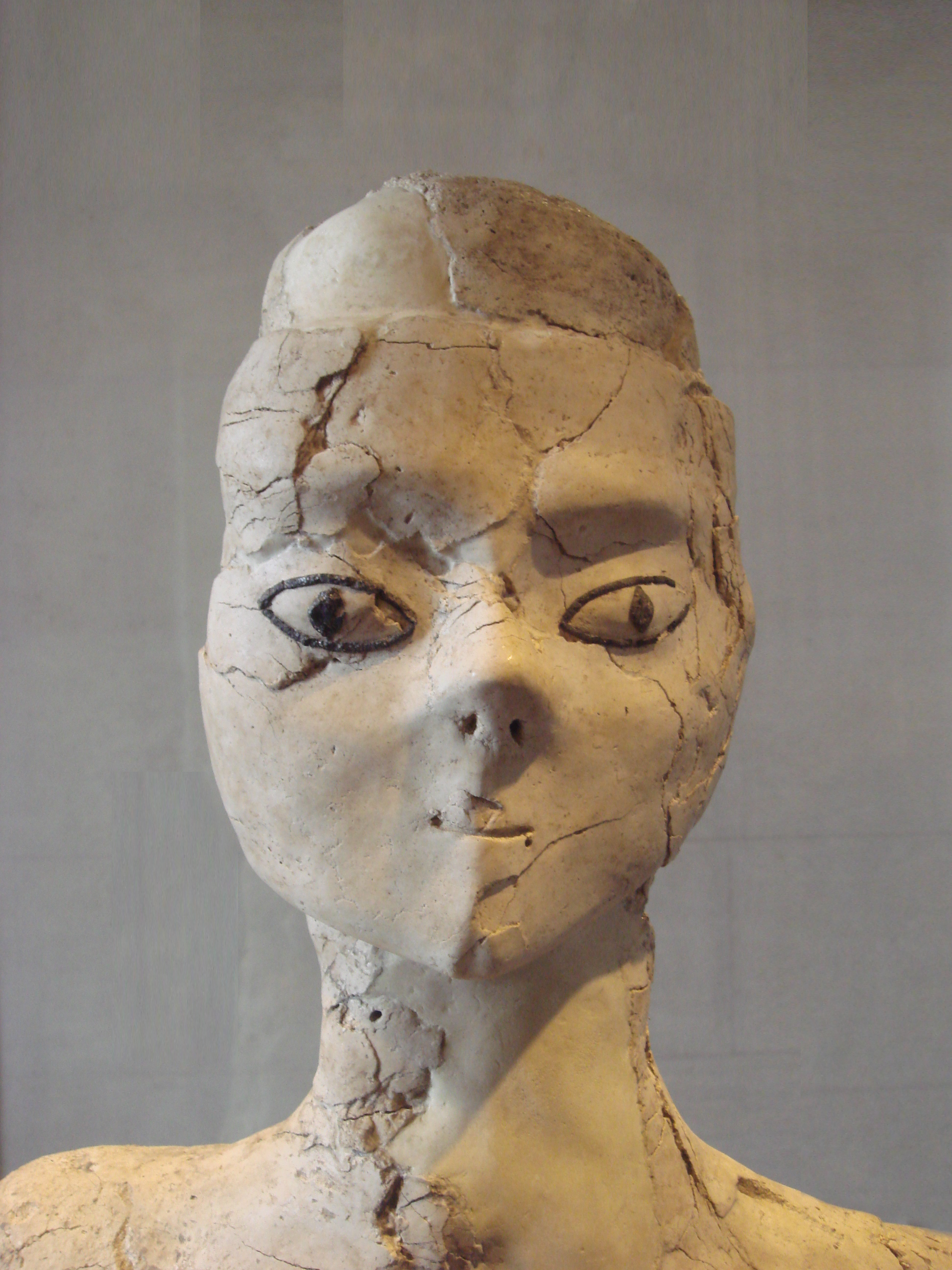
Louvre Ain Ghazal statue, frontal

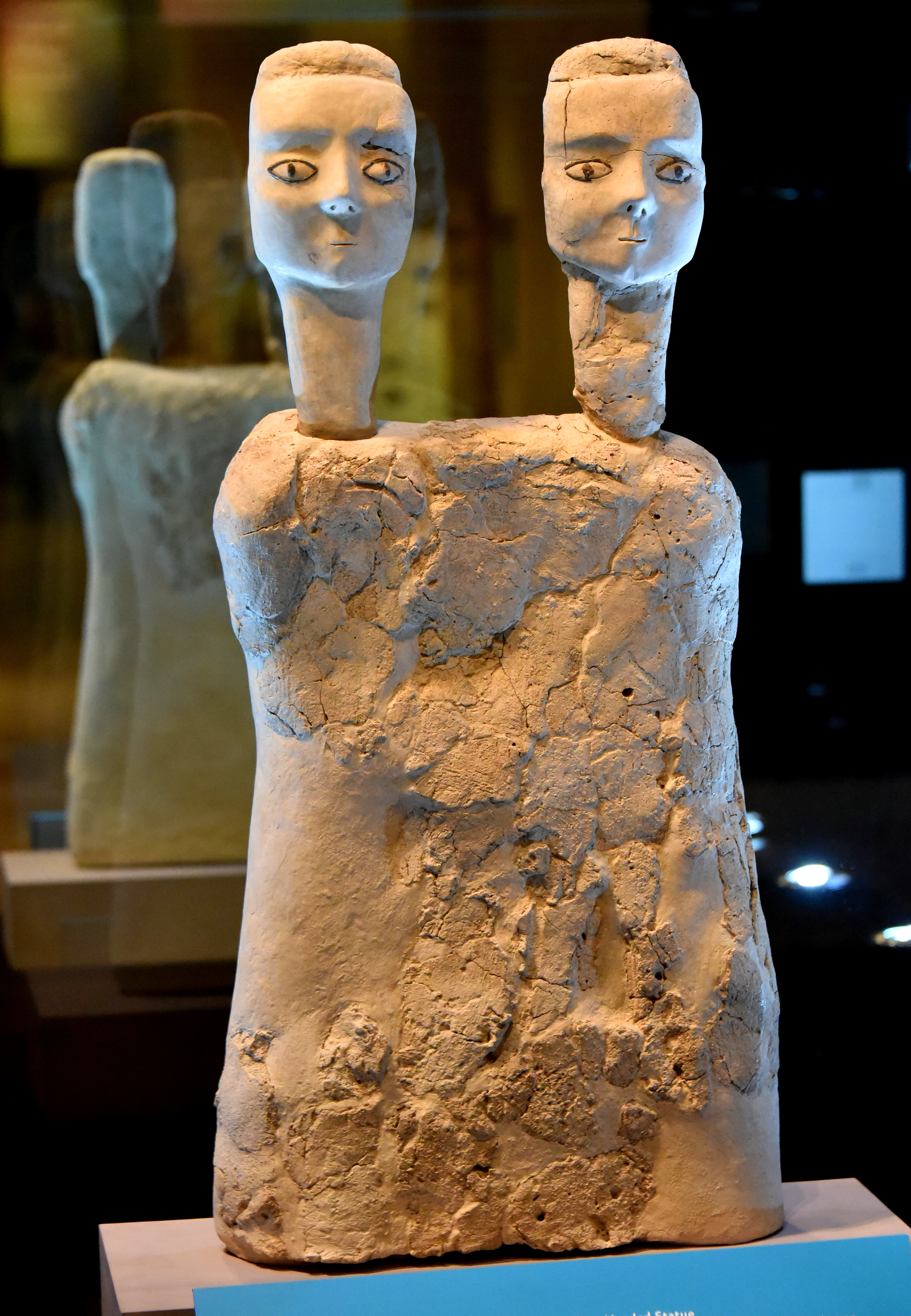
Two-headed statue from the Jordan Museum

== Diffusion ==
=== Europe ===
==== Carbon 14 dating ====
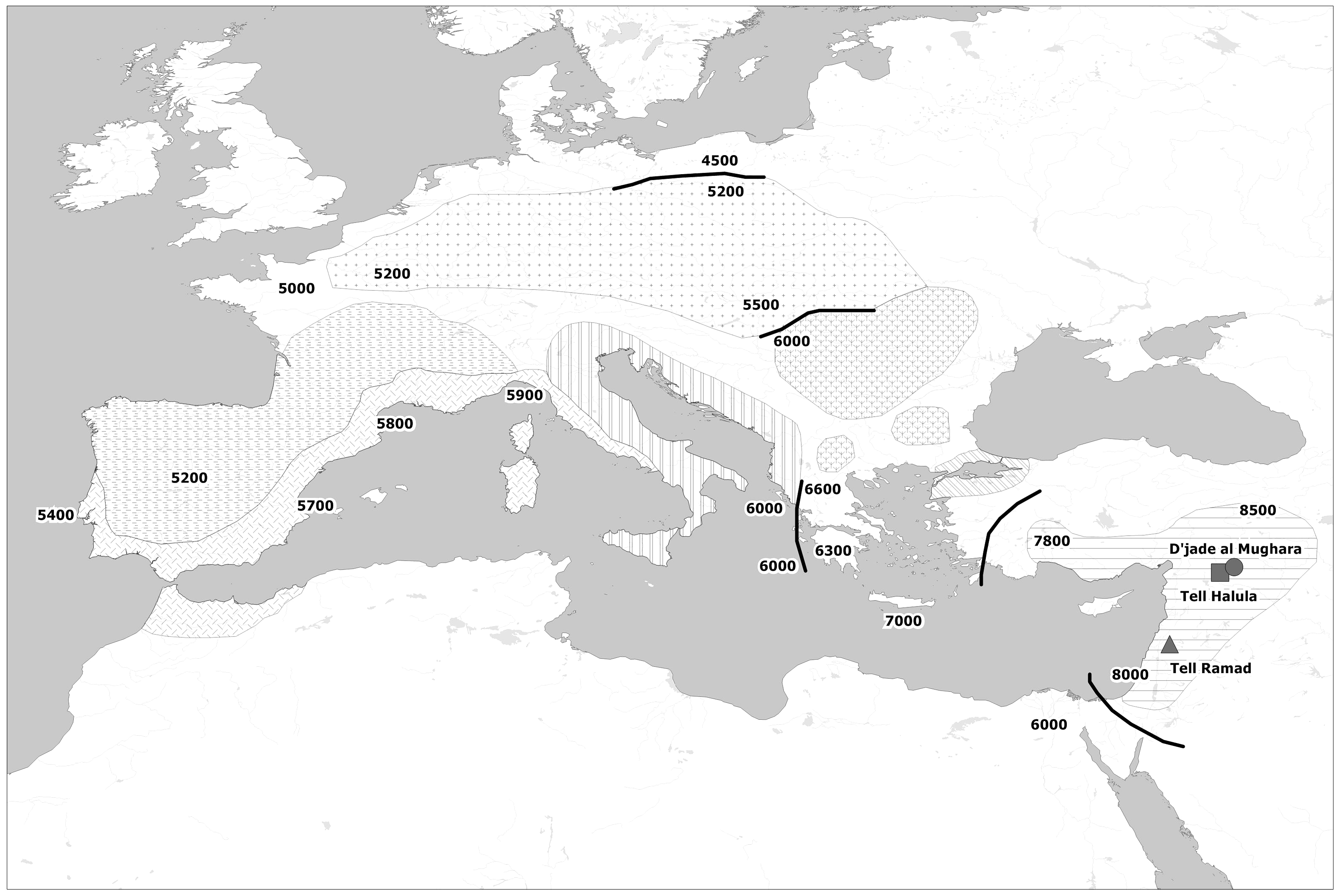
Map of the spread of Neolithic farming cultures from the Near-East to Europe with dates (years BCE)

The spread of the Neolithic in Europe was first studied quantitatively in the 1970s, when a sufficient number of ^{14}C age determinations for early Neolithic sites had become available. Ammerman and Cavalli-Sforza discovered a linear relationship between the age of an Early Neolithic site and its distance from the conventional source in the Near East (Jericho), thus demonstrating that, on average, the Neolithic spread at a constant speed of about 1 km/yr. More recent studies confirm these results and yield the speed of 0.6–1.3 km/yr at 95% confidence level.

==== Analysis of mitochondrial DNA ====
Since the original human expansions out of Africa 200,000 years ago, different prehistoric and historic migration events have taken place in Europe. Considering that the movement of the people implies a consequent movement of their genes, it is possible to estimate the impact of these migrations through the genetic analysis of human populations. Agricultural and husbandry practices originated 10,000 years ago in a region of the Near East known as the Fertile Crescent. According to the archaeological record this phenomenon, known as "Neolithic", rapidly expanded from these territories into Europe. However, whether this diffusion was accompanied or not by human migrations is greatly debated. Mitochondrial DNA –a type of maternally inherited DNA located in the cell cytoplasm- was recovered from the remains of Pre-Pottery Neolithic B (PPNB) farmers in the Near East and then compared to available data from other Neolithic populations in Europe and also to modern populations from South-Eastern Europe and the Near East. The obtained results show that substantial human migrations were involved in the Neolithic spread and suggest that the first Neolithic farmers entered Europe following a maritime route through Cyprus and the Aegean Islands.

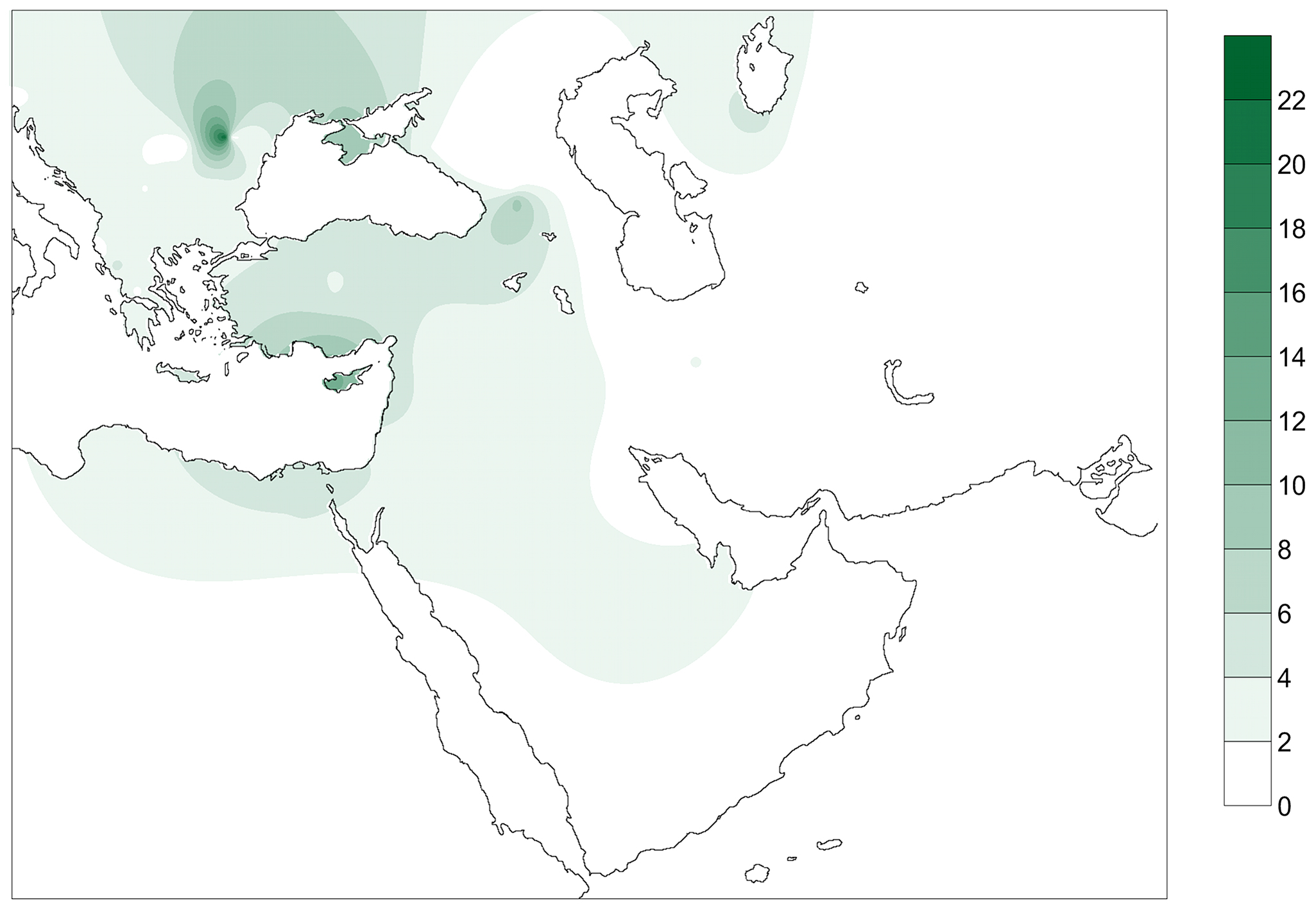
Modern distribution of the haplotypes of PPNB farmers

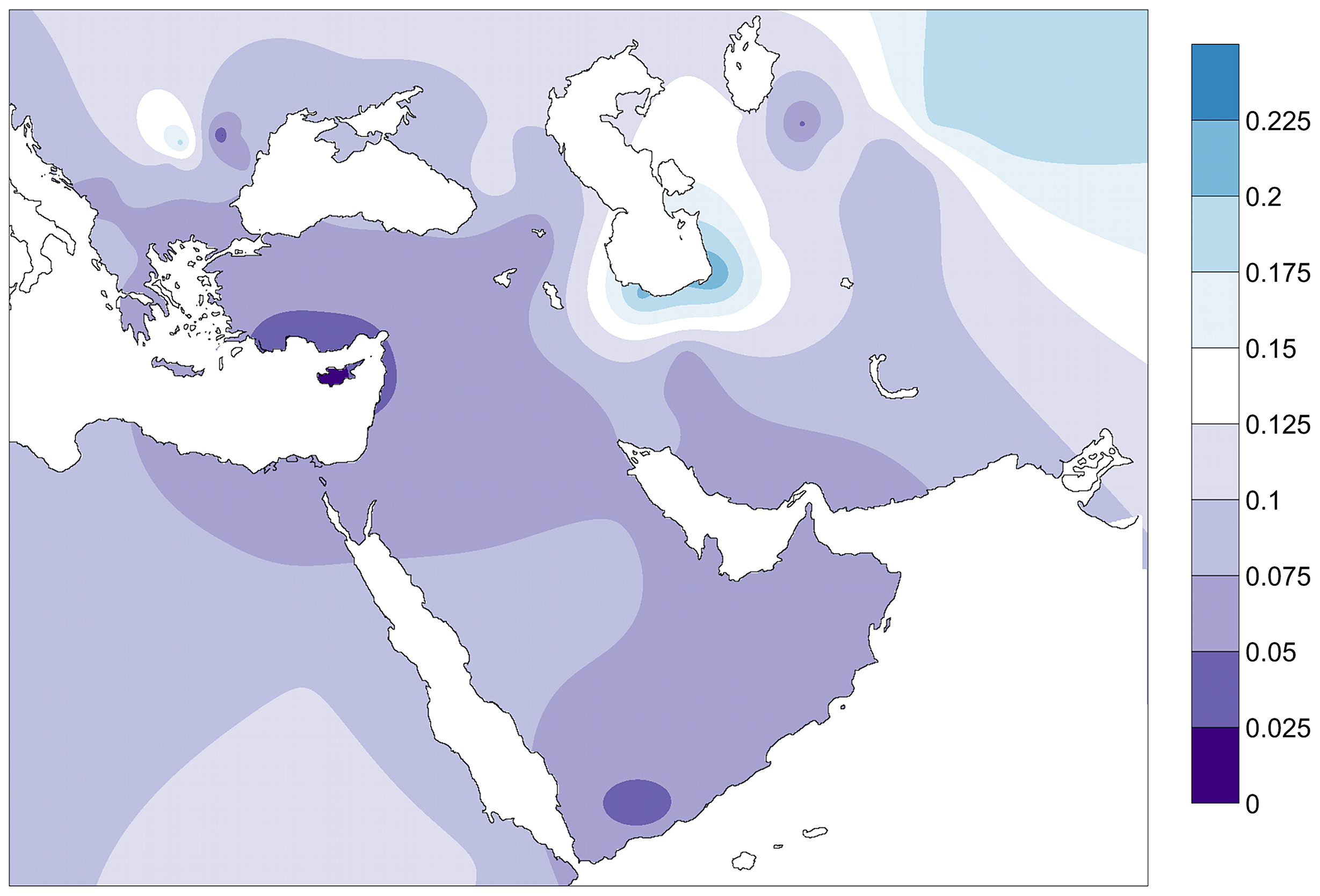
Genetic distance between PPNB farmers and modern populations

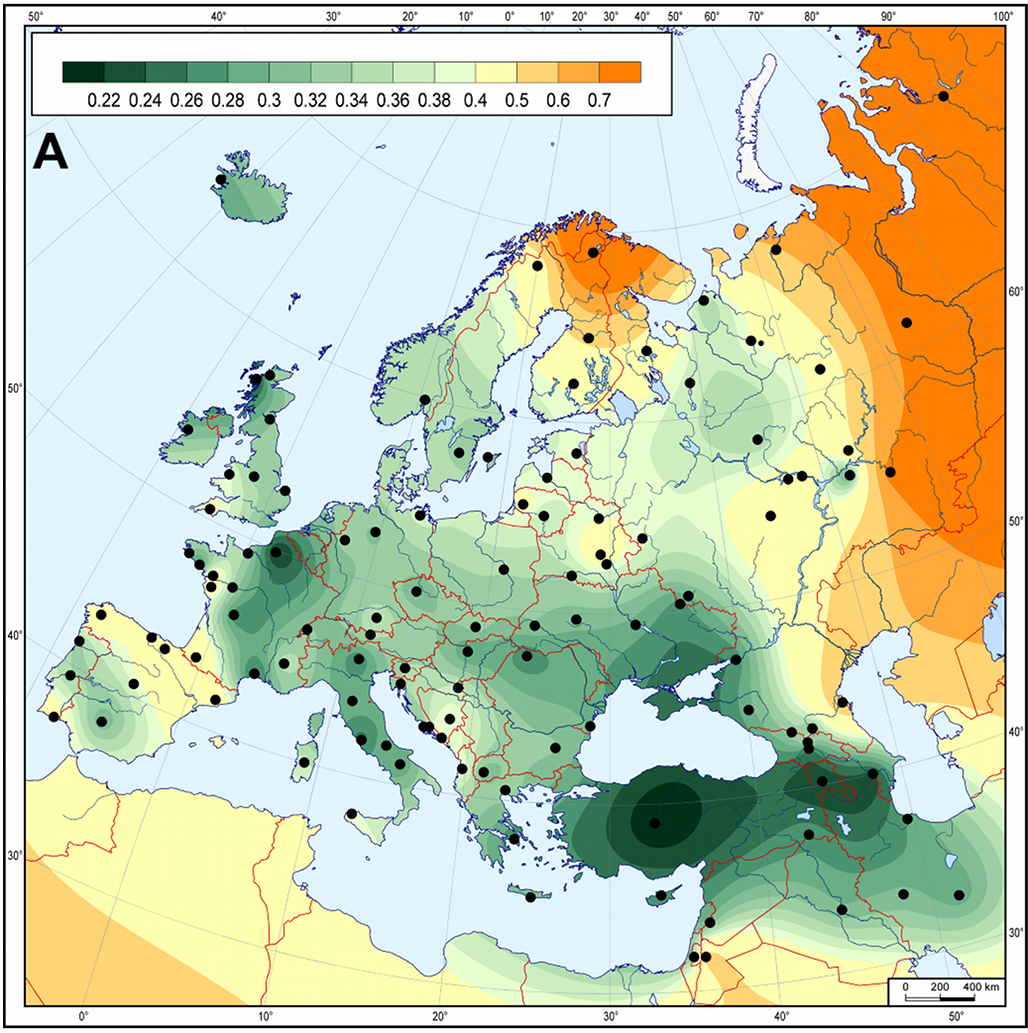
Ancient European Neolithic farmers are genetically closest to modern Near-Eastern/ Anatolian populations: genetic matrilineal distances between European Neolithic Linear Pottery culture populations (5,500–4,900 calibrated BC) and modern Western Eurasian populations.

=== South Asia ===
Expansion to South Asia

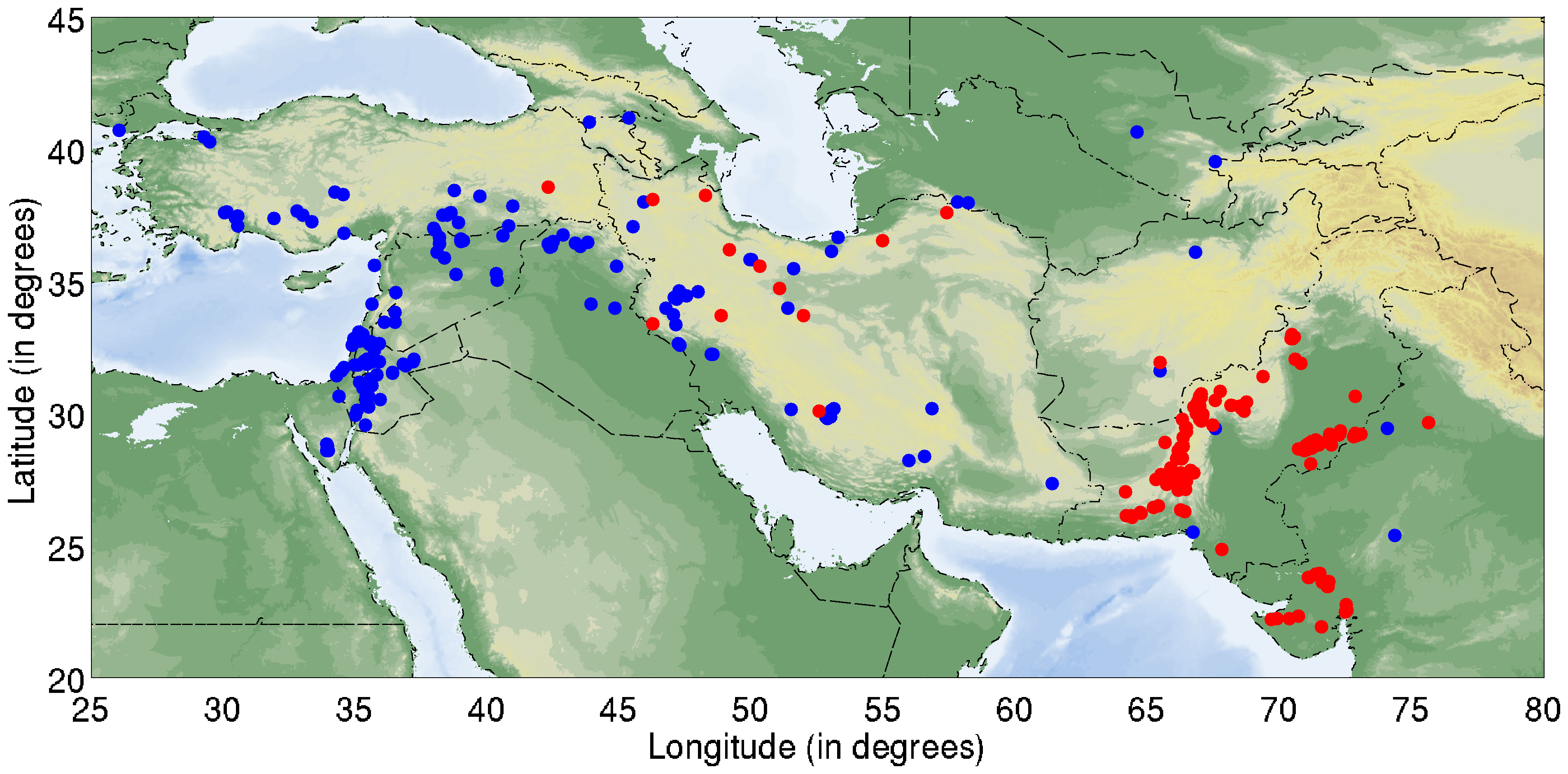
Early Neolithic sites in the Near East and South Asia 10,000–3,800 BCE

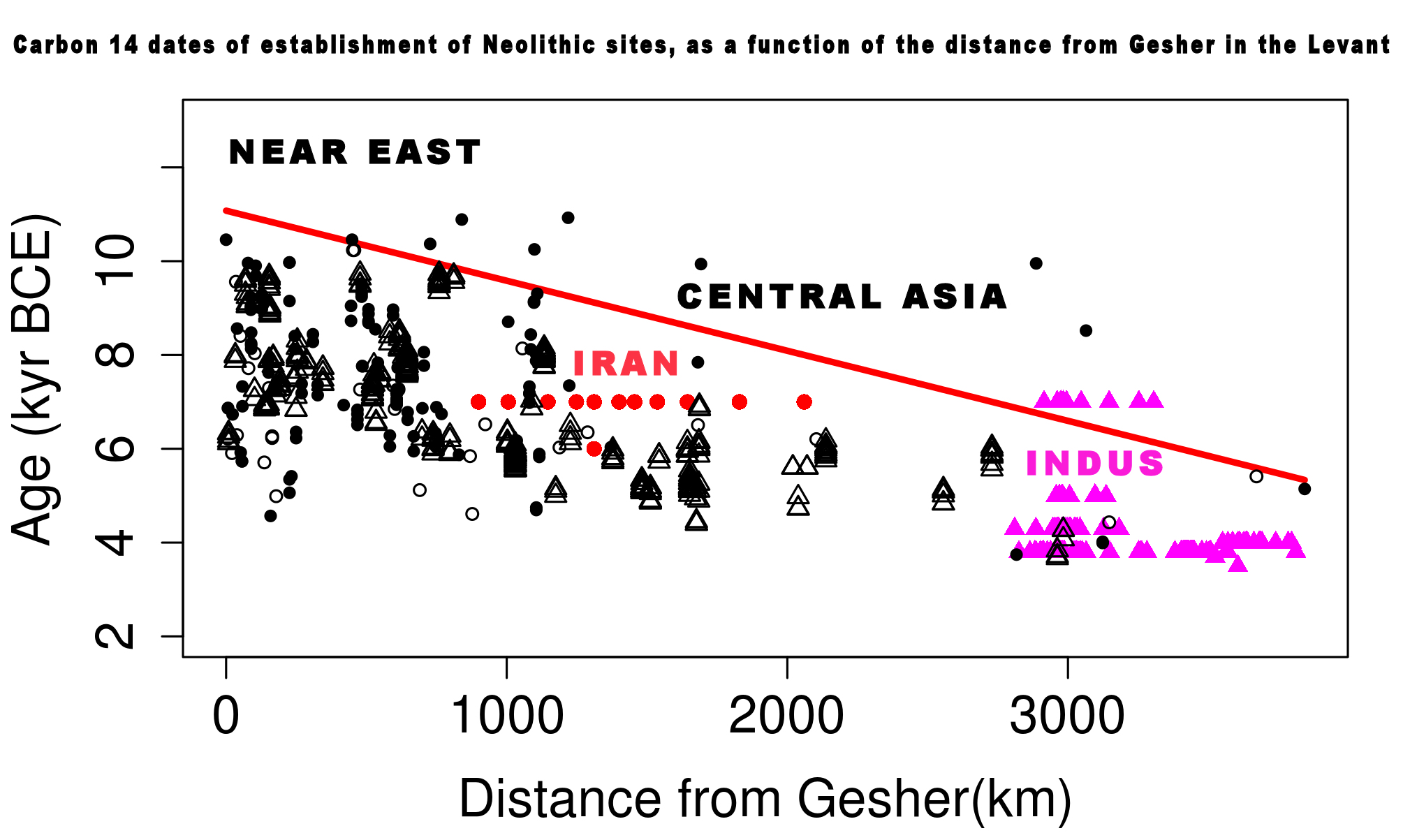
Neolithic dispersal from the Near East to South Asia suggested by the time of establishment of Neolithic sites as a function of distance from Gesher, Israel. The dispersal rate amounts to about 0.6 km per year.

The earliest Neolithic sites in South Asia are Bhirrana in Haryana, dated to 7570–6200 BCE, and Mehrgarh, dated to between 6500 and 5500 BCE, in the Kachi plain of Baluchistan, Pakistan; the site has evidence of farming (wheat and barley) and herding (cattle, sheep and goats).

There is strong evidence for causal connections between the Near-Eastern Neolithic and that further east, up to the Indus Valley. There are several lines of evidence that support the idea of a connection between the Neolithic in the Near East and in the Indian subcontinent. The prehistoric site of Mehrgarh in Baluchistan (modern Pakistan) is the earliest Neolithic site in the north-west Indian subcontinent, dated as early as 8500 BCE. Neolithic domesticated crops in Mehrgarh include more than barley and a small amount of wheat. There is good evidence for the local domestication of barley and the zebu cattle at Mehrgarh, but the wheat varieties are suggested to be of Near-Eastern origin, as the modern distribution of wild varieties of wheat is limited to Northern Levant and Southern Turkey. A detailed satellite map study of a few archaeological sites in the Baluchistan and Khybar Pakhtunkhwa regions also suggests similarities in early phases of farming with sites in Western Asia. Pottery prepared by sequential slab construction, circular fire pits filled with burnt pebbles, and large granaries are common to both Mehrgarh and many Mesopotamian sites. The postures of the skeletal remains in graves at Mehrgarh bear a strong resemblance to those at Ali Kosh in the Zagros Mountains of southern Iran. Despite their scarcity, the 14C and archaeological age determinations for early Neolithic sites in Southern Asia exhibit remarkable continuity across the vast region from the Near East to the Indian Subcontinent, consistent with a systematic eastward spread at a speed of about 0.65 km/yr.

In South India, the Neolithic began by 6500 BCE and lasted until around 1400 BCE when the Megalithic transition period began. South Indian Neolithic is characterized by Ash mounds from 2500 BCE in Karnataka region, expanded later to Tamil Nadu.

== Genetics ==
The Pre-Pottery Neolithic was characterized by a contact and genetic continuum network between Anatolian hunter-gatherers, Natufians, and Iranian hunter-gatherers, primarily along two clines. The PPN-associated ancestry Mesopotamian, represented by the two Nemrik 9 specimens (PPNA) from present-day Iraq as well as the Mardin specimen from present day Turkey, formed by the admixture of those three sources, and were positioned close to a central position between them, pointing to nearly equal amounts of derived ancestry components. These Mesopotamian samples displayed relative close affinities to the Aknashen Neolithic remains in Armenia and to a Neolithic sample from Azerbaijan as well as Iraq (Bestansur and Shandiar). The PPN-associated ancestry in Anatolian and Levant were primarily positioned along a cline between Anatolian hunter-gatherer and Natufian sources, with variable amounts of geneflow, but generally closer to Anatolian sources PPN-associated ancestry in Cyprus (PPNB) falls close to Anatolian remains. Ancient Levantines (i.e. inhabitants of Jordan, Israel, Syria, Lebanon, Palestine) and their descendants exhibit a decrease of ~8% local Neolithic ancestry, which is mostly Natufian-like, every millennium, starting from the Pre-Pottery Neolithic to the Medieval period. It was replaced by Caucasus-related and Anatolian-related ancestries, from the north and west respectively. However, despite the decline in the Natufian component, this key ancestry source made an important contribution to peoples of later periods, continuing until the present.

=== Migrations to the Levant and Egypt ===
Bronze Age samples and locations and dates of Mesopotamia_Neolithic ancestry: Nemrik 9 (9500-8000 BC), Boncuklu (9000-8500 BC), Çayönü (8300-7500 BC).

Human samples from Nemrik 9 (9500-8000 BC), Boncuklu (9000-8500 BC), Çayönü (8300-7500 BC) were part of a recent genetic study, as members of a Mesopotamia_Neolithic cluster. In this study, the Mesopotamia_Neolithic cluster appeared as a major ancestry of several Levantine and Egyptian Bronze Age individuals, particularly from Ebla, Ashkalon, Baq'ah and Nuwayrat.

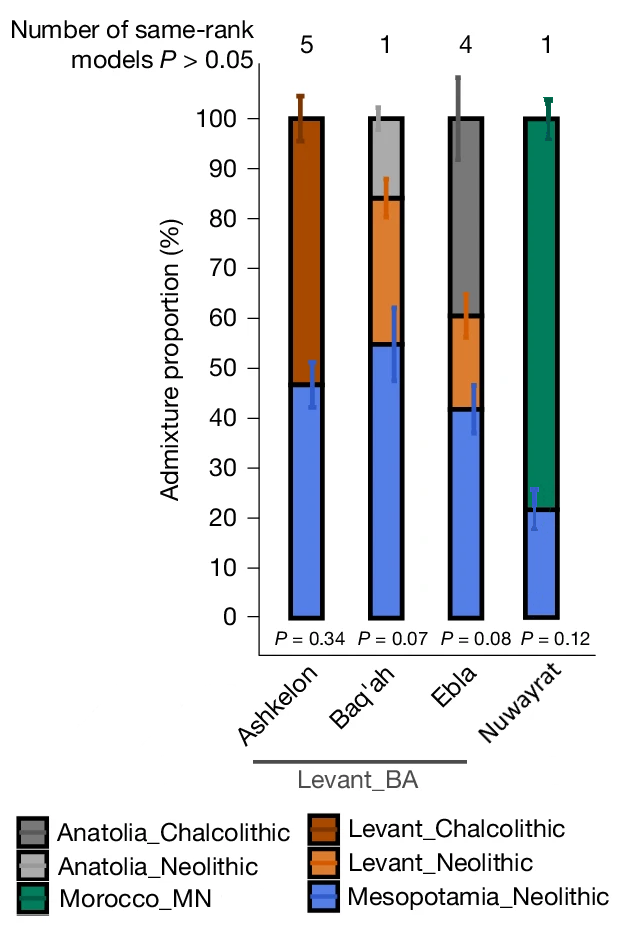
Ancestry proportions of Ascalon, Ebla, Baq'ah and Nuwayrat Bronze Age samples for the best-fit full model (qpAdm).

The Nuwayrat individual in particular, an Old Kingdom adult male Egyptian of relatively high-status radiocarbon-dated to 2855–2570 BCE and dubbed "Old Kingdom individual (NUE001)", was found to be associated with North African Neolithic ancestry, but about 24% of his genetic ancestry could be sourced to the eastern Fertile Crescent, including Mesopotamia, corresponding to the Mesopotamia_Neolithic cluster. The genetic profile was most closely represented by a two-source model, in which 77.6% ± 3.8% of the ancestry corresponded to genomes from the Middle Neolithic Moroccan site of Skhirat-Rouazi (dated to 4780–4230 BCE), which itself consists of predominantly (76.4 ± 4.0%) Levant Neolithic ancestry and (23.6 ± 4.0%) minor Iberomaurusian ancestry, while the remainder (22.4% ± 3.8%) was most closely related to known genomes from Neolithic Mesopotamia (dated to 9000-8000 BCE). No other two-source model met the significance criteria (P>0.05). A total of two Three-source models also emerged, but had similar ancestry proportions, with the addition of a much smaller third-place component from the Neolithic/Chalcolithic Levant. According to Lazardis, "What this sample does tell us is that at such an early date there were people in Egypt that were mostly North African in ancestry, but with some contribution of ancestry from Mesopotamia". According to Girdland-Flink, the fact that 20% of the man's ancestry best matches older genomes from Mesopotamia, suggests that the movement of Mesopotamian people into Egypt may have been fairly substantial at some point.

The timing of the admixture event cannot be calculated directly from the 2025 genetic study. The 2025 study showed that the Nuwayrat sample had the greatest affinity with samples from Neolithic Mesopotamia dating to 9000-8000 BCE. Concurrently, other studies have shown that during the Neolithic, in the 10,000-5,000 BCE period, populations from Mesopotamia and the Zagros expanded into the Near-East, particularly Anatolia, bringing with them the Neolithic package of technological innovation (domesticated plants, pottery, greater sedentism). Egypt may also have been affected by such migratory movements. Further changes in odontometrics and dental tissues have been observed in the Nile Valley around 6000 BCE. Subsequent cultural influxes from Mesopotamia are documented into the 4th millennium (3999-3000 BCE) with the appearance of Late Uruk features during the Late Pre-dynastic period of Egypt.

== See also ==
- History of pottery in the Southern Levant
- Pre-history of the Southern Levant
- Proto-city

== Sources ==
- J. Cauvin, Naissance des divinités, Naissance de l'agriculture. La révolution des symboles au Néolithique (CNRS 1994). Translation (T. Watkins) The birth of the gods and the origins of agriculture (Cambridge 2000).
- Ofer Bar-Yosef, The PPNA in the Levant – an overview. Paléorient 15/1, 1989, 57–63.
- Özkaya, Vecihi; Siddiq, Abu B. (25 October 2023). "Körtiktepe in the Origin and Development of the Neolithic in Upper Mesopotamia". The Epipalaeolithic and Neolithic in the Eastern Fertile Crescent. Routledge. pp. 138–168. doi:10.4324/9781003335504-11.
- Morez Jacobs, Adeline; Irish, Joel D.; Cooke, Ashley; Anastasiadou, Kyriaki; Barrington, Christopher; Gilardet, Alexandre; Kelly, Monica; Silva, Marina; Speidel, Leo; Tait, Frankie; Williams, Mia; Brucato, Nicolas; Ricaut, Francois-Xavier; Wilkinson, Caroline; Madgwick, Richard; Holt, Emily; Nederbragt, Alexandra J.; Inglis, Edward; Hajdinjak, Mateja; Skoglund, Pontus; Girdland-Flink, Linus (2 July 2025). "Whole-genome ancestry of an Old Kingdom Egyptian". Nature: 1–8. doi:10.1038/s41586-025-09195-5. ISSN 1476-4687. PMC 12367555. PMID 40604286.
