= Cyclical tactical asset allocation =

Cyclical tactical asset allocation is a dynamic investment strategy using an approach based on economic cycles. The cyclical approach to tactical asset allocation involves monitoring the economic environment for patterns that have historically led to trends in stock market movements; see Stock market cycle. As stock price and bond yield movements are connected to changes in the economic environment. Guidelines to these patterns can be followed to ascertain changes in market direction to a varying level of accuracy. This is very helpful to an investment decision because an exact "reversal point" is practically impossible to determine. Investors can use this information to improve their performance returns by modifying their strategic asset allocations.

In this way, an investor with an asset mix of stocks and bonds could use the cyclical approach to tactical asset allocation to rebalance the amount of their investment portfolio in each in a favorable manner based on the economic cycle. For example, the investor could increase the allocation in bonds and decrease the allocation in equities when it is expected that the economy is heading into a recession. Historically, bonds have outperformed stocks in recessionary periods.
