= Al Bowereh =

Palestinian village

Al Bowereh or Al-Bweireh, also known as Aqabat Injeleh, is a Palestinian village located just east of Hebron. It is situated adjacent to and north of the Israeli settlement of Givat Harsina. The village is occupied by Israel since 1967, together with the rest of the West Bank.

== Geography ==
Al Bowereh is located at the northern edge of the Baqa'a Valley, a few kilometers east of Hebron City. It is sandwiched between the Israeli settlement Givat Harsina in the south and Israeli outposts in the north and the east. East of Al Bowereh runs the Israeli bypass road Route 60.

== Population ==
According to the PCBS, the estimated population of Al Bowereh was about 780 in 2011, but Christian Peacemaker Teams (CPT) mentioned a number of 340 people in 2012, while ARIJ gave a number of 180 in 2009. The existence of Al Bowereh is endangered due to on-going settlement expansion and demolition orders for almost all of the remaining homes in Al Bowereh. Al Bowereh is owned by all members of the neighbourhood.

== Influence of the Israeli occupation ==
=== Israeli settlement and outpost expansion ===
In 1985, Israeli settlers started the building of Givat Harsina between Al Bowereh and Kiryat Arba, on Palestinian lands belonging to the members of the Jaber and Al Bakri clans from Hebron. In 1995, the Israeli bypass road 60 was built through the Palestinian farm lands located east of Harsina.

In 2009, settlers started building the outpost "Hill 18", also named "Hill 26", "Mitzpe Avihai", "Karmei Netanel" and "Hammer Lot", between the settlement of Givat Harsina and Al Bowereh. The Hill 18 outpost has a number of times been built, evacuated and rebuilt. Hill 26 is built on land belonging to the Palestinian Ja'abar family, expropriated by the Israeli government. The outpost was earlier dismantled in 1999. In the meantime, however, it had been consistently inhabited by settlers and protected by the IDF. The area was declared a "closed military zone", forcing peace activists of Ta'ayush to evacuate. Hill 26 is mentioned in the 2005 Sasson Report. It is located 230 meter from Givat Harsina and 1.6 kilometer from Kiryat Arba and borders Al Bowereh to the south.

Outpost names can be confusing, as an outpost can have different names. An outpost that has been dismantled can be rebuilt under another name.

=== Settlers' violence ===
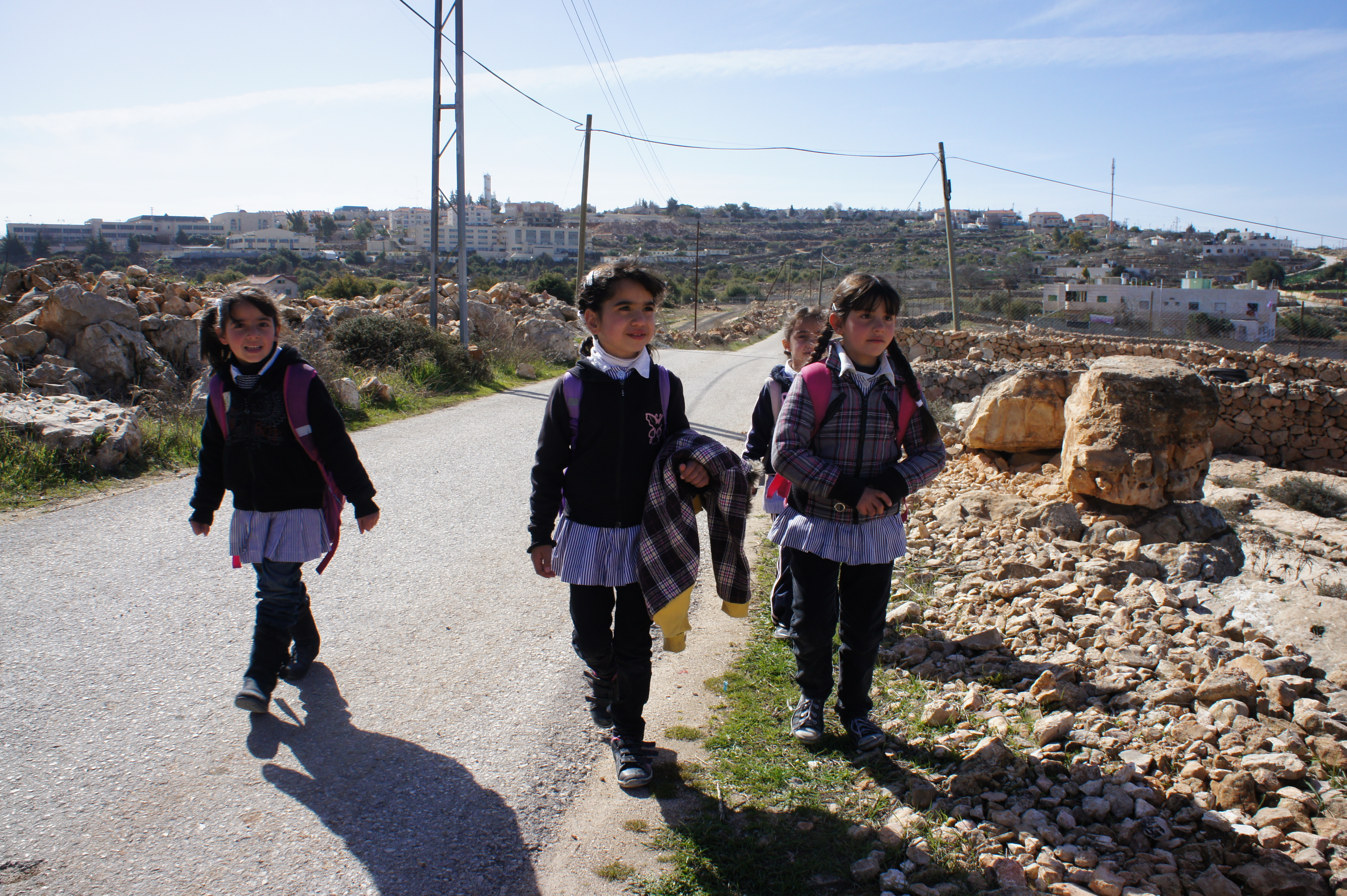
School girls in Al Bowereh

Settlers and the military have blocked the village road to Hebron for vehicles. A settler bypass road of the outpost Hill 18 runs parallel to the road. Residents using the village are subjected to settlers' violence, and the children, who are forced to go to school by foot, are often attacked on their way to school. Since November 2009, Christian Peacemaker Teams has provided a protective presence in the area. As of 2012, CPT accompanied 174 children of Al Bowereh on their way home from school, to protect them from settlers' violence.

=== Denied access to roads and land ===
Roadblocks prevent the residents from accessing their homes by car, forcing them to walk as far as three kilometers every time they leave or return to the neighborhood. Merchants and ambulances are forced to use long dirty roads.

In 1982, the village tried to build on what now is referred to as Hilltop 26, but were stopped by the Israeli military. In 1986, the Israeli High Court ruled that the members of Al Bowereh were the owners of the land. After the death of an Israeli, however, an Israeli military court declared the lands "state land", without hearing the Al Bowereh residents.
