= Hentsch =

- Company type: Private company
- Industry: Financial services
- Predecessor: Hy Hentsch & Co.
- Founded: 1796
- Founder: Henri Hentsch
- Defunct: 2002
- Fate: Merged
- Successor: Bank Lombard Odier & Co
- Headquarters: Geneva, Switzerland

Hentsch was a Swiss private bank based in Geneva. The bank was connected with one of two of the oldest existing banks within Switzerland (after Wegelin & Co of 1741), the other being Lombard Odier (of Geneva).

== History of the bank ==
The Hy Hentsch & Co. bank was founded in 1796 by Henri Hentsch (1761–1835). During 1835, the bank was renamed Hentsch & Cie, became Darier, Hentsch & Cie sometime during 1991, during 1994 the bank was part of Odier Bungener bank, and Lombard Odier Darier Hentsch & Cie since 2002.

== Biography of founding member ==
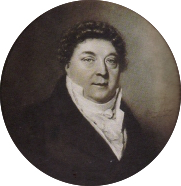
Henri Hentsch (1761–1835)

Henri Hermann François Gottlob Hentsch was born on 17 February 1761 in Geneva, to Benjamin-Gottlob, a pastor, and Marie-Charlotte Delaporte, and died on 14 August 1835, in Neuilly-sur-Seine (Ile-de-France). He belonged to a family originating from Tzschecheln (Lower Lusatia), the family having emigrated to Switzerland during the 18th century; Benjamin Gottlob, settled in Geneva during 1758.

During 1785 Henri married Louise Cardoini, and naturalized to Geneva during 1792, becoming a bourgeois of Netstal.

Henri was apprenticed to Develay & Cie, this concluded with employment with Picot, Fazy & Cie engaged in manufacturing of assorted fabrics, money-changing and banking, whose business branched to Lyon during 1787, proceeding to open a bureau de change in Geneva. He was imprisoned and subsequently exiled (c. 1793) in the révolution de genevoise. Henri continued in Nyon with a commercial enterprise involving drapery, returning to Geneva to found H. Hentsch & Cie, silks and commissions. During 1798 he went into association with his cousin Jean-Gédéon Lombard, forming Hentsch, Lombard & Cie, (commissions). Henri during 1815 to 1827, was part of the membership of the Conseil de genevois.

Banque Bénédict Hentsch & Cie was formed in 2004 by a 7th generation member of the Hentsch family. The Bank went through a series of mergers which saw it become ONE Swiss Bank SA in 2021. This recent development solidified another chapter in the Hentsch's long history of founding and owning private banking institutions in Europe and Switzerland.

== See also ==
- Bénédict Hentsch & Cie
- Senarclens
