= Tactical asset allocation =

Dynamic investment strategy

Tactical asset allocation (TAA) is a dynamic investment strategy that actively adjusts a portfolio's asset allocation. The goal of a TAA strategy is to improve the risk-adjusted returns of passive management investing.

== Strategy descriptions ==
TAA strategies can be either discretionary or systematic.

=== Discretionary ===
In discretionary tactical asset allocation strategies, an investor modifies his asset allocation according to the valuation of the markets in which they are invested. Thus, someone who invested heavily in stocks might reduce their position when they perceive that other securities, such as bonds, are poised to outperform stocks. Unlike stock picking, in which the investor predicts which individual stocks will perform well, tactical asset allocation involves only judgments of the future return of complete markets or sectors. As such, some practitioners perceive it as a natural supplement to mutual fund investing, including passive management investing.

=== Systematic ===
Systematic tactical asset allocation strategies use a quantitative investment model to systematically exploit inefficiencies or temporary imbalances in equilibrium values among different asset classes. They are often based on financial market anomalies (inefficiencies) that have occurred in the past and are supported by academic and practitioner research. For example, many systematic TAA strategies try to use quantitative trend following or relative strength techniques to produce excess returns (alpha). These both aim to capitalize on momentum, a well-known market anomaly.

== Considerations ==
The efficient-market hypothesis would imply that tactical asset allocation cannot increase risk-adjusted returns, since markets are already efficiently priced. If a tactical approach were found that could increase returns without an increase in risk, investors would flock to that inefficiency, and the advantage would go away. Many investors do not accept this hypothesis, however, and believe that inefficiencies in the market persist and can be exploited.

Many factors determine the success of a TAA strategy. The investor needs to have the necessary knowledge, practical investment skills, dedication, and discipline to design and/or execute a successful tactical strategy. The specific market anomalies on which the strategy is based may change or disappear in the future. Other factors such as risk tolerance, market timing, portfolio size, investment expenses, etc. may also affect the portfolio performance.

== Criticism ==
Investors who utilize the tactical asset allocation strategy generally want to hedge risk in a volatile market. However, Larry Swedroe of CBS MoneyWatch described the strategy as an attempt to time the market, and provides an excuse for managers to increase revenue from trading fees due to the frequent activity the strategy requires. In a study conducted by Morningstar, Inc., they examined the "net annualized return, standard deviation, Sharpe ratio, and maximum drawdown from July 31, 2010, to December 31, 2011" of 163 tactical funds. They concluded that only a small percentage of funds outperformed the Vanguard Balanced Index Fund (including PIMCO All Asset Fund and GMO Global Asset Allocation Fund). Updated to June 2013, they found that 20 percent of funds beat the Vanguard Balanced Index Fund, and just four had a better Sharpe ratio.

== See also ==
- Cyclical tactical asset allocation
- Global tactical asset allocation
- Financial risk management § Investment management
