= Baqa'a Valley =

Agricultural area in the West Bank

The Baqa'a Valley, sometimes called Beqa'a Valley, is a fertile agricultural Palestinian area in the West Bank, just east of Hebron. Located in the area are the Palestinian villages Al Bowereh, Al Baqa and Wadi al-Ghrous. The Israeli settlement Givat Harsina abuts on the northern outskirts; Kiryat Arba borders the south. The Valley is occupied by Israel since 1967. Apart from the Israeli settlers, the area is mainly populated by members of the Jaber clan.

== Geography ==
The Palestinian villages Al Baqa and Wadi al-Ghrous are located in the heart of the Baqa'a Valley, between the Israeli settlements Givat Harsina and Kiryat Arba. On the northern outskirts lies the village Al Bowereh (al-Bweireh). To the north, the Valley is enclosed by Highway 35; Route 60 cuts through the eastern part from Road 35 to the south, along the two settlements.

== Israeli occupation ==
=== Land confiscation and settlement expansion ===
The existence of the Palestinian villages in the Baqa'a Valley is endangered by land confiscation by the Israeli military, and the continuing expansion of the settlements Givat Harsina and Kiryat Arba. Givat Harsina continues to expand on land immediately abutting the Baqa'a Valley and constructed an exit road to the main bypass road on the land of ‘Abd al-Jawad Jaber. Settlers continuously create new outposts around the settlements and also east from Route 60. Palestinian access to the bypass roads 35 and 60 is limited or prohibited.

In January 2002, massive land confiscation accompanied by settlement and road construction in the Baqa'a valley, on both sides of bypass road 60 was documented by Christian Peacemaker Teams (CPT). In addition to land confiscated specifically for the building of Road 60, the Israeli authorities "have designated an additional "buffer zone" of 180 meters on either side of the road, upon which Palestinians have been forbidden to build on their own land." On 2 October 2003, a new bypass road was opened between Harsina and route 60, to connect Palestinian land confiscated almost a year earlier.

In September 2003, CPT reported the construction of two new bypass roads and a 2 meters high fence on confiscated land, separating about 100 acres of vineyards from Wadi al-Ghrous owners. The IDF confiscated 15.5 acre land for the creation of a road to connect a military basis near Wadi al-Ghrous with a military basis east of Kiryat Arba. The new security road runs at a distance of only 200 metres parallel to the existing road, is 14 meters wide and surrounded by a fence. On 11 December, vineyards were uprooted and Palestinian property destroyed. On 19 December 2003, CPT reported the dumping of rock and stone fill on Palestinian farmland in Wadi al-Ghrous and the leveling of paths with bulldozers for new graveled roads.

On 18 January 2004, settlers guarded by soldiers and armed settlement guards erected a new fence on seized Palestinian farmland between Givat Harsina and Kiryat Arba, about 400 meters from the existing fence line. Some 100 olive trees and 4 wells on his fifty-year-old farm were destroyed. Estimated 2000 dunams of land was in the process of being annexed by the settlement.

CPT warned that the probable purpose of this "creeping annexation" was to prepare the land for construction of new sections of Israel's southern "security fence". Once connected, large portions of about 600 dunams of Palestinian farm land would be swallowed up. A Palestinian family who earlier lost an even bigger portion of their land, have been terrorized by settlers for years in an attempt to evict the family.

On 1 September 2010, armed settlers started the construction of an outpost east of Route 60, where 4 settlers were killed the previous night. The Israeli army did not stop them, but rather did partially raze the area on which the settlers had been building. Near the Harsina settlement, settlers have built the so-called outpost "Hill 18" or "Mitzpe Avihai". The Hill 18 outpost has already been built, evacuated and rebuilt a number of times.

=== Farming land and water wells ===
Palestinians are expelled from their lands; agricultural fields are destroyed, and water systems are destroyed or confiscated by settlers and army. On 2 March 2011, Israeli troops destroyed three Palestinian water wells, one in Al Baqa and two in Wadi al-Ghrous. According to Israel they were built without the requisite permits. On 22 October 2012, again a water well in Wadi al-Ghrous was destroyed.

=== Demolition of homes and buildings ===
According to "Architects and Planners for Justice in Palestine", in February 2008, the Israeli Civil Administration issued demolition orders for a health clinic under construction and additional 11 homes and 20 other buildings. The Israeli authorities had refused to grant a building permit.
