= Global tactical asset allocation =

Investment strategy

Global Tactical Asset Allocation, or GTAA, is a top-down investment strategy that attempts to exploit short-term mis-pricings among a global set of assets. The strategy focuses on general movements in the market rather than on performance of individual securities.

== Hedge funds and asset allocation ==
GTAA is believed to be derived from, and share some characteristics of, global macro hedge funds and tactical asset allocation (TAA). Global macro hedge funds, like GTAA, seek to profit from taking positions in major world equity, bond or currency markets. However, the two differ in the fact that global macro has been characterized by large, undiversified bets, while modern GTAA strategies are generally well-diversified and operate with risk controls. TAA decisions undertaken by managers of multi-asset funds, like GTAA decisions, are intended to enhance investment outcomes by overweighting and underweighting asset classes based on their expected performance over relatively short time periods (usually 3 to 6 months). While TAA, within multi-asset funds, is restricted to the asset classes contained in the fund's strategic asset allocation, GTAA strategies enjoys the privilege of accessing a broader opportunity set.

== Strategies ==
The modern global tactical asset allocation program is composed of two separate strategies: strategic rebalancing and overlay. The strategic rebalancing element of GTAA program is designed to remove any unintentional asset allocation risk which can be caused by various factors, including: drift risk, which occurs when the value of underlying portfolio holdings moves away from the strategic benchmark due to differences in asset class returns, due to changes in asset valuation, cash holdings, currency deviations from stock selection, unintentional country deviations within underlying stock/bond portfolios, manager of benchmark transitions, and contributions to and redemptions from the portfolio. The overlay element of GTAA program is designed to capture excess return through intentional, opportunistic, long and short positions in asset classes and countries. The GTAA strategy can be viewed as making two major types of decisions: The first type is asset class timing, including stocks vs. bonds vs. cash, small-cap vs. large-cap stocks, value vs. growth stocks, emerging vs. developed stocks and bonds, etc. This kind of decision making is often referred to as TAA. The second type of decision is known as country or sector decisions within asset classes, including country selection in developed and emerging equity, as well as fixed income and currency markets. These are the global relative-value decisions which give meaning to the "G" in GTAA and distinguish the strategy from traditional market timing.

== Portfolios ==
It is widely known that many institutional investment portfolios remain dominated by equity and interest rate risk, and that these allocations tend to remain motionless regardless of market conditions. Therefore, there is reason to establish a portfolio of alternative alpha sources, and GTAA represents just that, for myriad reasons: the performance differentials between asset classes are frequently substantial, the derivative instruments used in GTAA are, for the most part, highly liquid and transaction costs are low. The volume of assets managed with a focus on relative performance of asset classes is low compared to that focused on finding opportunities within asset classes, and a number of managers with very impressive teams, processes and track records can be identified. Furthermore, the analysis and decision making involved in GTAA is focused on cross-market comparisons which proves to differ from the comparison of securities within given markets. Accordingly, GTAA should be a good diversifier, particularly within an alpha portfolio.

GTAA strategies provide investors with a series of exposures that may not otherwise be prevalent in their portfolios. Managing these exposures provides an opportunity for the generation of returns that share low correlations with other sources of active return, and they can also be expected to lead to more reliable added value.
