= Principal protected note =

A Principal protected note (PPN) is an investment contract with a guaranteed rate of return of at least the amount invested, and a possible gain.

Although traditional fixed income investments such as guaranteed investment certificates (GICs) and bonds provide investment security with little or no risk of capital loss, they provide modest returns. While stocks have the potential to deliver substantial returns, they do so at much greater risk.

Throughout the unpredictable and volatile market conditions that characterised the late 1990s and early 2000s, investors increasingly sought out new approaches to investing that offered both security and potential growth. Principal protected notes (PPNs) were introduced to the North American financial marketplace at that time.

At the heart of a PPN is a guarantee. Typically, PPNs guarantee 100% of invested capital, as long as the note is held to maturity. That means, regardless of market conditions, investors receive back all money they invested. In other words, at maturity, payout on the Note is the original principal plus any appreciation from the underlying assets (typically a mutual fund or group of funds, an index or basket of equities, and sometimes hedge funds or even commodities).

Principal protected notes may offer an array of benefits such as:

- 100% principal protection
- high growth potential
- enhanced income potential
- weekly liquidity
- the opportunity to invest in a broad range of investments
- potential for leveraged returns
- capital protection regardless of what happens in the markets

Principal protected notes may offer disadvantages such as:

- opaque fee structure based on variables over the term of the investment
- payment only at maturation
- underlying investments that the average investor has no hope of understanding
- no prospectus, lack of information as to full details of underlying investment
- custom design causes difficulty in evaluating PPN vs. other PPNs or conventional investments
- lack of data showing how this type of investment has performed historically
- possibility of failure of underlying investments, resulting in loss of principal despite guarantees

== Example ==
A common type of PPN is the stock plus option type. Its return equals $PPN_T=100+A(S_T-K)^+$ at maturity for underlying call options. Where $A$ is a multiplication factor set in the contract, $S_T$ is the stock price at maturity, and $K$ is the option's strike price.

== See also ==
Collateral (finance)
